= VDF =

VDF may be an acronym for:

- VHF Direction Finder
- Venda Defence Force
- Virginia Defense Force
- Visual DataFlex a Fourth-generation programming language now known simply as DataFlex.
- FAA LID for: Tampa Executive Airport (formerly known as Vandenberg Airport)
- Vinylidene difluoride, see: 1,1-Difluoroethylene
- Verifiable Delay Function, in cryptography
