= Jacqueline de Rojas =

British businesswoman (born 1962)

Jacqueline de Rojas CBE
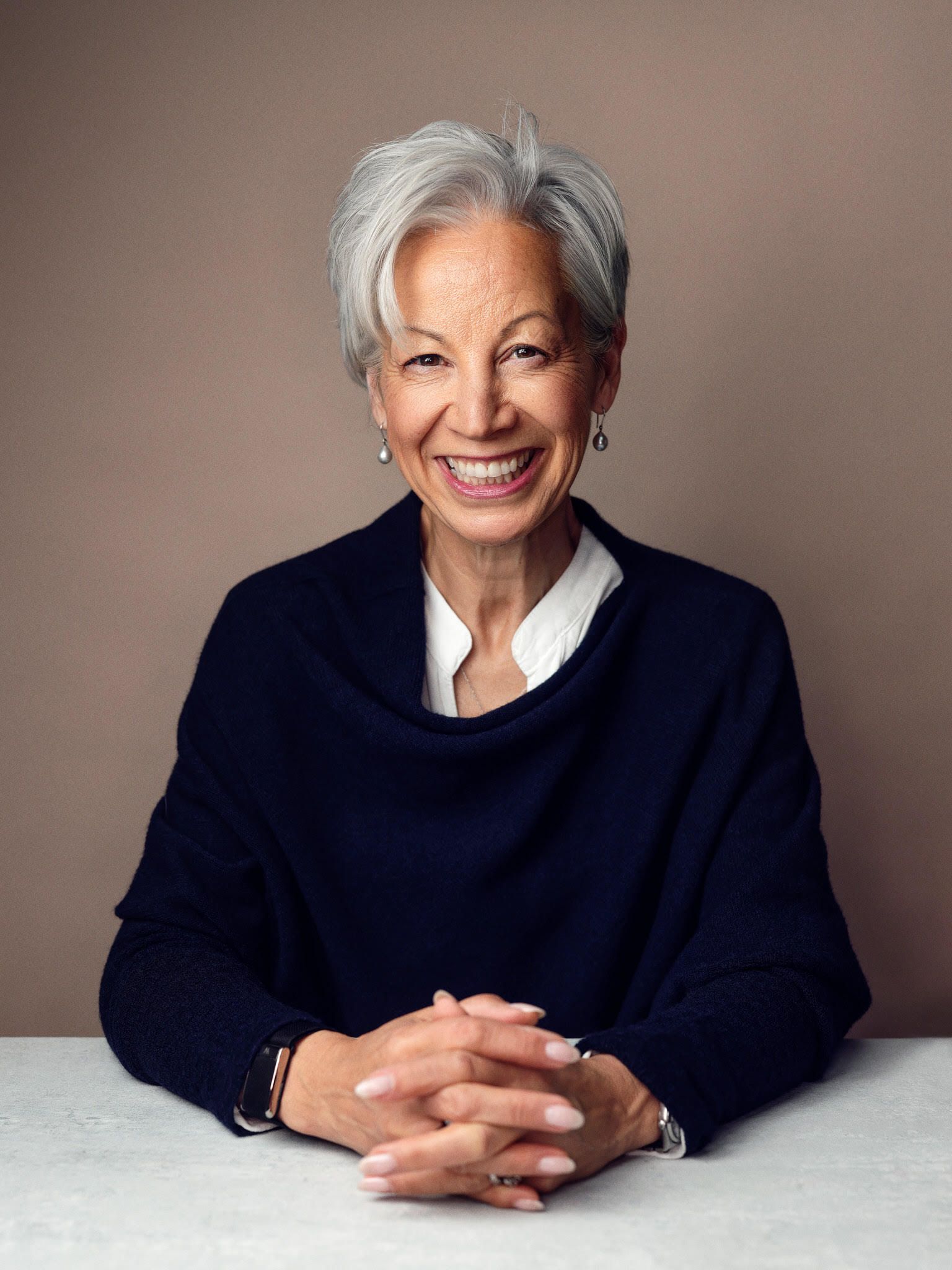
- Born: Jacqueline Yu; 11 October 1962 (age 63); Folkestone, England
- Other name: Jacqueline Jones
- Education: Middlesex University; Reutlingen University
- Employers: Rightmove; Bletchley Park; FDM Group; CA Technologies; Citrix Systems; Sage Group; Costain Group
- Known for: Technology
- Spouse: Roger Andrews
- Children: 3

Jacqueline de Rojas CBE (born Jacqueline Yu 11 October 1962) is a British technology executive, non-executive director, and advocate for digital skills and technology leadership in the United Kingdom. She has held senior leadership roles at global software companies including Citrix Systems, CA Technologies, and McAfee, and serves on the boards of several listed companies. She is chair of the Bletchley Park Trust and co-chair of the Institute of Coding.

de Rojas previously served as president of techUK from July 2015 to July 2022 and has been involved in national initiatives aimed at expanding digital skills education and increasing diversity in the technology sector. Through the Institute of Coding, a national consortium of universities and technology companies, programmes developed under its leadership have engaged more than one million learners in digital skills courses across the United Kingdom.

== Early life and education ==
Born Jacqueline Yu in Folkestone, England, de Rojas is of mixed British and Chinese heritage. She studied European Business through a dual-degree programme at Middlesex University in the United Kingdom and Reutlingen University (formerly Fachhochschule Reutlingen) in Germany.

Early in her career she worked in technology sales at Synon before moving into senior executive roles in the enterprise software sector.

== Career ==
=== Executive career ===
de Rojas has had a career spanning more than three decades in the global technology industry. She has held senior leadership and executive positions at major technology companies including Citrix Systems, CA Technologies, Novell, McAfee, Sage Group, and SAP BusinessObjects.

Through these roles she contributed to enterprise software development, international business expansion, and digital transformation initiatives across global markets.

=== Technology leadership and policy influence ===
de Rojas has contributed to national initiatives aimed at addressing the United Kingdom’s digital skills shortage and improving access to technology careers. As president of techUK she advocated for closer collaboration between government, industry, and educational institutions in order to expand the UK’s digital workforce and strengthen national technology capability.

In 2018 she was appointed co-chair of the Institute of Coding, a national consortium of universities and technology companies established to develop industry-aligned digital education programmes and broaden participation in computing and data science education. Programmes developed through the initiative have engaged more than one million learners across the UK.

de Rojas has also spoken publicly about diversity and inclusion in the technology sector, calling for greater representation of women and under-represented groups in digital careers and leadership roles.

=== Bletchley Park leadership ===
In October 2024, de Rojas was appointed chair of the board of trustees of the Bletchley Park Trust, becoming the first woman to lead the organisation responsible for preserving and promoting the historic site of Britain’s wartime codebreaking operations.

Under her leadership, Bletchley Park has continued to expand its role as a centre for public engagement with the history of computing and intelligence, while also exploring connections between the site’s legacy and contemporary developments in artificial intelligence and digital technology. Educational programmes and public events at the site increasingly address the relationship between historical codebreaking innovations and modern digital security, computing, and AI.

de Rojas has also highlighted the role of women in wartime intelligence work, noting that a large proportion of Bletchley Park’s wartime codebreakers were women.

=== Board positions ===
de Rojas has served on the boards of several publicly listed companies in the United Kingdom. Her current roles include Senior Independent Director and non-executive director at Rightmove and FDM Group, as well as non-executive director with board-level responsibility for sustainability at IFS AB. She also serves as chair of the Bletchley Park Trust and co-chair of the Institute of Coding. In addition to her board work, she is a mentor at Merryck & Co and a fellow of Kellogg College, Oxford. Earlier in her governance career she served as a non-executive director of Costain Group, AO World, and Home Retail Group, and was previously president of techUK.

=== Media and public engagement ===
de Rojas has appeared in national media discussing technology leadership, digital skills, and diversity in the technology sector. She was a guest on the Desert Island Discs on BBC Radio 4 and has been interviewed by publications including The Sunday Times and The Independent.

She has also participated in industry discussions and public events addressing artificial intelligence, digital transformation, and the future of technology education. Through her work with Bletchley Park and other institutions, she has helped connect the historical legacy of wartime codebreaking with contemporary debates on computing, cybersecurity, and AI.

de Rojas was appointed Bletchley Park Fellow at Kellogg College, Oxford in 2025, a fellowship linked to the college’s partnership with Bletchley Park and its research and public engagement on computing history and digital innovation. In February 2026 she also participated in a public conversation at Kellogg College during Bletchley Park Week titled “The Age of AI,” where she discussed the development and societal implications of artificial intelligence drawing on her experience in the technology sector.

== Personal life ==
de Rojas is married to Roger Andrews; they have three children and several grandchildren. She has spoken publicly about maintaining work–life balance through meditation and yoga.

== Awards and honours ==
- 2015 Computer Weekly Most Influential Woman in IT
- 2017 Catherine Variety Award for UK Science and Technology
- 2018 Appointed Commander of the Most Excellent Order of the British Empire (CBE) in the 2018 New Year Honours
- 2018 Computer Weekly Most Influential Women in UK IT Hall of Fame
- 2020 Honorary Doctorate of Engineering from the University of Bath.
