= Umang Gupta =

Indian-American entrepreneur (1949–2022)

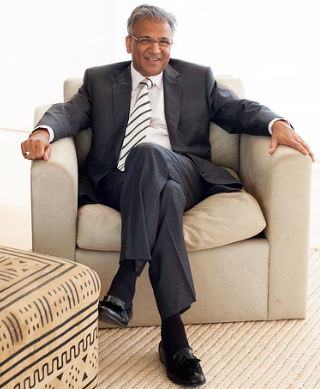
- Born: August 3, 1949; Patiala, Patiala and East Punjab States Union, Dominion of India
- Died: April 19, 2022 (aged 72); San Mateo, California, U.S.
- Education: IIT Kanpur (BTech); Kent State University (MBA)
- Occupations: Entrepreneur, philanthropist
- Mother: Ramnika Gupta

Umang Gupta (August 3, 1949 – April 19, 2022) was an Indian-American entrepreneur and Silicon Valley, California, executive credited with writing the first business plan for Oracle Corporation. He was also the founder of enterprise software company Gupta Technologies and was later the CEO of Keynote Systems.

== Early life ==
Gupta was born on August 23, 1949, in Patiala, the son of Ramnika Gupta and Ved Prakash Gupta. His mother was a politician and activist, while his father worked with the Indian labor ministry. He was raised by his father, Mr. Ved Prakash Gupta after his parents separated when he was a young child. He obtained his Bachelor of Technology degree in chemical engineering from IIT Kanpur in 1971. During his time at IIT Kanpur, Gupta was exposed to the first IBM computers in the country helping him develop his computer programming skills. After emigrating to the United States, Gupta also earned an MBA from Kent State University. In 1996, Umang received the Distinguished Alumnus Award of IIT Kanpur.

== Career ==
=== IBM and Oracle ===
After graduating, he joined IBM as a computer sales representative. After working seven years at IBM, in 1981 Umang Gupta joined Oracle Corporation as their 17th employee. He was credited with writing the company's first business plan in 1981 and was eventually promoted to vice president of the company's microcomputer products division. He remained in the role until his departure from the company in 1984.

=== Gupta Technologies ===
He was the founder and chief executive of Gupta Technologies, a client/server database and tools company, from 1984 to 1996, where he helped to usher in the era of client server computing with the first SQL database server and application development tools for PC networks. In the 1980s, products of Gupta Technologies included interfaces for programming custom applications and tools for programmers with a background in Cobol, dBase, or Visual Basic. Gupta was the first executive who had worked under Larry Ellison to start his own company. Gupta Technologies was the first Indian-run enterprise software company to go public on Nasdaq. Gupta sold the company in 1997.

=== Keynote Systems ===
Gupta was chairman and chief executive officer of Keynote Systems from December 1997. He oversaw the company as it went public in 1999. Gupta was able to negotiate the merger between Keynote and Vividence in 2004 after meeting Vividence CEO Peter Watkins at a poker game. It was sold to private equity company Thoma Bravo in August 2013.

=== Other ===
Gupta served as an advisor and investor in William Draper’s project to establish a venture capital fund for India in 1994. He served on the board of Mosaix, a company that developed call-center software, from 1997 to 1999, before it was sold to Lucent Technologies.

After selling Keynote Systems, Gupta dedicated his efforts to education for young children, founding SeaShells Education. One of his main initiatives was Reading Racer. Gupta developed the Reading Racer app with a team including Carnegie Mellon graduates Melanie Lam and Rodrigo Cano and also launched a foundation to continue support for Reading Racer. Gupta also began investing in educational technology companies such as Front Row Education.

In 2000, Gupta was honored with the Shreyas Mavanoor Foundation Award for Civic Leadership and Philanthropy. Gupta served on the board of the Peninsula Community Foundation, California, which later merged with another foundation to form the Silicon Valley Community Foundation, the largest community foundation in the United States. He along with his wife Ruth were donors to, and served as board members of PARCA, a non-profit organization in the San Francisco Bay Area devoted to the needs of the developmentally disabled and their families, and helped to found Raji House, a respite home for the developmentally disabled, located in Burlingame, California. Gupta also had an avid interest in history and served as Chairman of the Board and on the President’s Advisory Committee of the San Mateo County Historical Association (SMCHA); SMCHA operated the San Mateo County History Museum, where he and his wife helped sponsor the "Immigrants Gallery", also known as the “Land of Opportunity” Exhibit, a permanent exhibition to honor the contributions of immigrants to San Mateo County. Gupta and his wife Ruth also contributed $500,000 for the renovation of the San Mateo County History Museum, which was acknowledged as the biggest private contribution received by the museum.

Gupta was also a co-founder of the IIT Kanpur Foundation and served as Global Board Chairman of PanIIT, the alumni organization of over 200,000 alumni of the Indian Institutes of Technology. Bagla is credited with drafting the constitution of the Global PanIIT Association, which is used in the association's chapters around the world. He participated as an angel investor and advisor to various Silicon Valley technology companies.

Gupta was also a guest contributor to The New York Times.

== Personal life ==
Gupta was married to Ruth Gupta, an immigrant from the United Kingdom. The couple had two sons and a daughter. One of his sons died at an early age. The couple founded Raji House, a support center for developmentally disabled children. The center was associated with Partners & Advocates for Remarkable Children & Adults.

Gupta died on April 19, 2022, at his home in San Mateo, California, at the age of 72. He was diagnosed with terminal bladder cancer more than two years earlier.
