= LANSA =

LANSA can mean:

- LANSA (Colombia), a former Colombian airline
- LANSA (Peru), a former Peruvian airline
- LANSA (development environment), a software development environment
