= SystemBuilder/SB+ =

4GL development and runtime environment

SB/XA
- Developer: Rocket Software
- Release: 1985? as SystemBuilder
- Stable release: SB/XA 6.5.7 / October 18, 2022; 3 years ago
- Written in: Data/Basic, UniBasic, C, XAML
- Operating system: Linux, Microsoft Windows, Unix
- Platform: U2, D3
- Available in: English
- Type: 4GL
- License: Proprietary software
- Website: www.rocketsoftware.com/u2/products/sbxa

SB/XA is a 4GL development and runtime environment originally written for the Pick family of computer databases/environments and now part of the Rocket U2 software suite.

The SystemBuilder environment comprises SB+ Server, often running on a Rocket U2 database; SBClient, which runs as a Microsoft Windows desktop client; and the SB/XA Communications server for browser clients. The product can be run in either developer or runtime mode. The development environment enables rapid prototyping, development, and deployment of applications and supports a variety of user interface environments.

== History ==
System Builder originally owned by Computermatic PL was started in a garden shed in South Africa by first cousins Neill and Derek Miller in 1982. The popularity of the Pick database system, combined with a lack of a good development framework, led them to develop a tool to build standard menus and screens.

The product was very successful, and after expanding into international markets and after a few versions, they began to re-develop the product from the ground up. This was to become SB+ and was released in early 1990.

Traditionally, up to this time, Pick systems were accessed using green-screen terminals like the Wyse60 or VT100 but with the rise of the PC a new paradigm presented itself, and so around the end of 1991, the product was enhanced with the addition of a specialised terminal emulation client called Termulator! This was able to tightly integrate the server and the PC to allow for facilities like downloads direct from the server into Lotus 1-2-3 or the new kid on the block, Microsoft Excel.

Shortly after, the client program was renamed SBClient and had the ability to develop and render screens in either character or GUI mode.

Having been bought by Unidata Corporation in 1996, and following Unidata's merger with VMark Software Inc to form Ardent Software in 1998, the SystemBuilder product set came under the ownership of Informix in 2000 following their purchase of Ardent Software for its Datastage product. Subsequently, in 2001 Informix themselves were bought by IBM, and the U2 and SystemBuilder products eventually found their way to become part of IBM's Data Management portfolio.

Development of the SystemBuilder and RedBack products continued in Sydney until 2005, when they were merged with the U2 development team located in Denver, United States. On 1 October 2009, Rocket Software announced the purchase of the entire U2 suite, which includes SystemBuilder, from IBM.

== The SystemBuilder Development Environment ==
The System Builder/SB+ server environment is based around a set of key tools and utilities. These leverage out to provide comprehensive development environment, which is, itself, built mainly from these tools. SB+ includes an application menuing system, screen generator, a 3GL programming language, an expression language, the GUI components, and a report writer tool.

== Evolution ==
In August 2008, System Builder released SB/XA v6.0.0 SB/XA, which includes many enhancements to the System Builder suite, including a new user interface based on Web/XAML protocols. The most recent iteration of SB/XA may be found here in the Rocket Software Product Matrix
