= Screen generator =

Software to create data entry screens

A screen generator, also known as a screen painter, screen mapper, or forms generator is a software package (or component thereof) which enables data entry screens to be generated declaratively, by "painting" them on the screen WYSIWYG-style, or through filling-in forms, rather than requiring writing of code to display them manually. 4GLs commonly incorporate a screen generator feature. They are also commonly found bundled with database systems, especially entry-level databases. A screen generator is one aspect of an application generator, which can also include other functions such as report generation and a data dictionary. The earliest screen generators were character-based; by the 1990s, GUI support became common, and then support for generating HTML forms as well. Some screen generators work by generating code to display the screen in a high-level language (for example, COBOL); others store the screen definition in a data file or in database tables, and then have a runtime component responsible for actually displaying the form and receiving and validating user input.

== Examples ==
Examples of screen generators include:

- IBM Screen Definition Facility II: generates screens for CICS BMS, IMS MFS, ISPF, GDDM and CSP/AD.
- Performix for Informix.
- Microsoft Visual Basic
- the forms component of Microsoft Access
- Oracle Developer, in particular its Oracle Forms component
- the QDesign component of PowerHouse
- SystemBuilder/SB+
- the Screen Painter component of SAP's ABAP Workbench
- the FoxView component of FoxPro. FoxView was originally developed by Luis Castro as a dBASE screen generator named ViewGen; Fox purchased it and bundled it with FoxPro 1.0. Later, Fox replaced Castro's code with their own screen painter code.
- dBASE included a built-in screen generator in dBASE IV onwards; in dBASE III and earlier, third party screen generators were available, including the already mentioned ViewGen
- DPS 1100 for UNIVAC 1100 series mainframes.
