= Daegis Inc. =

- Formerly: Unify Corporation
- Type: Subsidiary
- Traded as: Nasdaq: UNFY
- Industry: Software & Programming
- Founded: California (1980)
- Fate: Acquired by OpenText
- Successor: OpenText
- Headquarters: Irving, Texas
- Products: AXS-One; Edge; TD Mobile; Team Developer; NXJ; Accell/SQL; SQLBase
- Revenue: ▼31.0 million USD (2014)
- Operating income: ▼0.17 million USD (2014)
- Net income: ▼ (1.6 million) USD (2014)
- Number of employees: 140 (2015)
- Website: http://www.opentext.com/what-we-do/products/opentext-product-offerings-catalog/rebranded-products/daegis

Daegis Inc. (formerly Unify Corporation) was one of the early developers of database management systems and tools for database development. It was founded in 1980 and headquartered in Irving, Texas. Unify initially focused on providing databases and 4th-generation programming language (4GL) development tools for the Unix platform, but with Windows taking over the desktop computer Unify released VISION, a 4GL cross-platform development tool that supports Windows, Linux and Unix.

The company's total revenue for fiscal year 2014 was $31.0 million. As of 2015, it employed 140 people worldwide.

== History ==
Unify was co-founded in 1980 by Nico Nierenberg, William "Bill" Osberg, and David Edwards. In 1986 it released Accell IDS, one of the first integrated 4GL applications, and the next year released Unify 2000, an OLTP database engine written in C that was the predecessor to Unify DataServer.

In 1993 Nierenberg and Osberg left Unify to form Actuate Corporation. In 1995 the corporate headquarters moved to San Jose under Reza Mikailli, but in 2000 the company reported accounting irregularities, placed Reza Mikailli on leave, and Todd Wille took over as CEO. Corporate headquarters returned to Sacramento and Unify was delisted from Nasdaq, not returning until 2008. Mikailli was convicted of security fraud and conspiracy charges in 2003.

Also in 2003 the company laid off about half of the development staff to focus on sales and marketing, and in 2005 it acquired Acuitrek and formed the Insurance Risk Management (IRM) division. The next year, Halo Technologies made a stock-only buyout offer for approximately $21 million, but instead, the IRM division was traded for Gupta Technologies. 2009 saw the acquisition of CipherSoft, an Oracle application modernization company, and AXS-One, a content archive provider. Headquarters moved from Sacramento, California to Irving, Texas.

In 2010, Unify acquired Daegis, an eDiscovery solution provider.

In 2011, Unify changed its name to Daegis.

In 2012, the database and tools division of Daegis/Unify was renamed to Gupta Technologies.

In 2013, the company sold the domain name unify.com to Siemens Enterprise Communications for their Unify re-branding.

In 2015, the company was acquired by OpenText.
