= Clarion (programming language) =

Database language, released 1986

- Paradigms: Imperative, structured, object-oriented
- Family: Pascal
- Developer: Jensen & Partners International (JPI), Clarion International, SoftVelocity
- First appeared: April 1986; 39 years ago
- Stable release: 11 / October 2018; 6 years ago
- Platform: IA-32
- OS: DOS, Windows
- License: Proprietary
- Website: www.softvelocity.com

Clarion is a commercial, proprietary, fourth-generation programming language (4GL), multi-paradigm, programming language and integrated development environment (IDE) from SoftVelocity used to program database applications. It is compatible with indexed sequential access method (ISAM), Structured Query Language (SQL), and ActiveX Data Objects (ADO) data access methods, reads and writes several flat file desktop database formats including ASCII, comma-separated values (CSV), DOS (binary), FoxPro, Clipper, dBase, and some relational databases via ODBC, Microsoft SQL Server, Sybase SQL Anywhere, and Oracle Database through the use of accelerated native database drivers, and XML, Clarion can be used to output to HTML, XML, plain text, and Portable Document Format (PDF), among others.

The Clarion development environment (IDE) runs on the Clarion language. The IDE provides code generation facilities via a system of templates which allow programmers to describe the program from an abstract level higher than code statements. The generator then turns this higher level into code, which in turn is then compiled and linked using a normal compiler and linker. This generation layer is sometimes referred to as 4GL programming. Using the generation layer is optional. It is possible to create programs fully at the code level (the so-called 3 Lager), bypassing all code generation facilities.

If the templates are used to generate code, then programmers are able to inject their own code into the generated code to alter, or extend, the functions offered by the template layer. This process of embedding code can be done while viewing the surrounding generated code. This mixing of template code and generated code allows the template settings to be updated, and the code regenerated, without loss of the embedded code.

The templates (from which the code is generated) are provided in source form and developers are free to create their own templates. Many templates have been written by various developers: some are offered as commercial add-ons, and some are free.

Two main Clarion products exist: Professional and Enterprise Edition.

== History ==
The first release of the Clarion language was a DOS product named Clarion 1.0 and was first released in April 1986. Clarion was created by Bruce Barrington, one of the founders of healthcare firm "HBO & Company" (later acquired by McKesson Corporation,) and a small team of developers. Barrington's goal was to create a language that would be compact and expressive, and would maximize the use of the memory-mapped screen of the IBM PC by creating a screen designer. Version 1 produced p-code; the initial release included a screen designer, an interpreter, an editor, and a debugger. Initially it supported databases composed of DAT files which was Clarion’s proprietary ISAM file format. Bruce Barrington formed Barrington Systems and released version 1.0.

In 1991 Barrington licensed compiler technology from a company named Jensen & Partners International (JPI). JPI was founded in 1987 by Niels Jensen, who had earlier (1979 or 1981) been one of the founders of Borland. Philippe Kahn was the marketing person who built Borland around the $49 Turbo Pascal compiler. Niels and his team were working on a new compiler technology at Borland when Kahn decided to buy Wizard C, and name it Turbo C. Niels and several other developers left Borland and started JPI, where they continued to work on their compiler technology, named TopSpeed, which they bought from Borland for $1.7 million.

During this time the relationship between Clarion Software and JPI grew closer, and on April 30, 1992, Clarion merged with JPI to form an entity which would eventually be named TopSpeed Corporation. Employees at the TopSpeed Development Centre in London went to work on CDD and resolved many of the bugs.

Clarion 12 is the latest version, released on May 15, 2025.

== Notability ==
Clarion is historically known as being one of the first 4GL computer programming tools, first developed in the 1980s.

== Reception ==
InfoWorld in 1986 criticized Clarion's requirement of a hardware dongle and inability to produce standalone compiled code, reporting its p-code as slower than compiled Turbo Pascal but faster than interpreted dBASE III Plus. The magazine found the language's features comparable to dBASE's, easy to learn, fast to develop with, and with excellent technical support, but needing more and better documentation.
