= SheerPower4GL =

SheerPower 4GL is a fourth-generation programming language developed by Touch Technologies, Inc. SheerPower 4GL is the result of porting Touch Technologies' Intouch 4GL programming language that runs on OpenVMS (for DEC Alpha and VAX computers) to Windows, launching in 2000. Downloads are free from the official SheerPower 4GL website. SheerPower 4GL is similar to the BASIC programming language, and is easy to learn.

== Features ==
SheerPower 4GL has several key features:

It is free for hobbyists and non-profit organizations.

Web scripting features make it fast and easy to develop dynamic web pages using SheerPower's BASIC-like syntax. Version 5.0 was the official release containing the syntax and logic for web scripting in SheerPower.

SheerPower utilizes a "Perfect Precision Math Package" for which the patent 7149765 "Apparatus and method for precision binary numbers and numerical operations" is applied to. This precision math eliminates the rounding off errors experienced when using a floating point data type.

SheerPower comes bundled with ARS – Advanced Record System database engine. ARS is a proprietary database engine also developed by Touch Technologies, Inc. TTI created the ARS engine because performance is critical in many applications. For example, ARS is over 20 times faster than MySQL for shared read/write operations.

Open Database Connectivity - SheerPower supports other database engines through its ODBC interface, and its own ARS engine can be accessed via ODBC in other database applications.

SheerPower Internet Services (SPINS) Webserver also comes bundled with SheerPower 4GL. The SPINS Webserver comes bundled with SheerPower and was developed for simplicity in use and high-speed for performance. On a modern multi-core system, the SPINS web server can perform over 1,000 page hits per second—given enough bandwidth of course.

There is also a Common Gateway Interface (CGI) interface built into SheerPower, along with many other built-in functions designed for high-performance and increased programmer productivity.

== Security ==
SheerPower 4GL has the following built-in security features:

A SheerPower program cannot be run from any Windows Temporary folder. This stops computer viruses written into SheerPower programs from being emailed and run when the email is opened.

SheerPower does not mix data and code during database operation, which makes it impervious to SQL injection attacks.

== Platforms ==
A binary distribution is available for Microsoft Windows NT, 2000, 2003, XP and Vista. The virtual machine can be downloaded alone for the purpose of running .SPSRC or .SPRUN programs (SheerPower source code files or deployed files with the code encrypted).

== License ==
The software is free for non-commercial use, its terms undefined besides levels of support for business customers. Non-profit organizations and hobbyist programmers can use the free license that comes with the download. License fees are outlined for those wanting to develop applications for commercial or business use. High-priority support packages are available. Email and web forum support is available at no charge. Sheerpower is 100% free for all uses including commercial purposes.
