= M-Power =

Low code development platform

m-Power is a low-code development platform that uses a point-and-click interface to create enterprise web applications. M-Power is developed with open source languages such as CSS, HTML, and JavaScript. Applications created by m-Power run on any database or platform that supports Java. In addition to low-code development, m-Power also includes business intelligence and business process automation capabilities.

== History ==
m-Power’s predecessors date back to 1983, when mrc developed the mrc-Query Series. The mrc-Query Series was originally built to enable business people at all levels to become independent of programmers. However, it developed a following with programmers and developers because it automated much of the tedious syntax work they faced on a daily basis.

In 1987, mrc developed the mrc-Productivity Series. The mrc-Productivity Series provided web development, rapid application development, and real-time reporting capabilities in one package. Additionally, it was a “trainable” code generator, meaning users could teach the mrc-Productivity Series which language to develop applications in, as well as their own coding standards and syntax.

The mrc-Productivity Series, however, was limited to the DB2/400 database. In an effort to branch out beyond the AS/400 market, mrc trained the mrc-Productivity Series how to generate Java code. Using the newly trained mrc-Productivity Series, mrc developed m-Power in 2004.

== Awards ==
- IBM Star Stream Application Award (1996) - The international Star Stream Application competition is designed to showcase the most outstanding AS/400 application solutions developed by IBM business partners worldwide.
- Midrange Systems Buyers Choice Award (1998) - The Buyers Choice Awards is an annual competition open to all third-party vendors of IBM midrange computing products and services.
- AS/400 Technology SHOWCASE Product Excellence Award (2000) - Voted Best Product in the AS/400-based Application Development category in the 2000 AS/400 Technology SHOWCASE Product Excellence Awards.
- Apex Award for Application Development (2004) - Editors' Choice winner in the Application Development Systems category.

== See also ==
- Google Web Designer
- CoffeeCup HTML Editor
