= Oracle Forms =

Type of software

- Developer: Oracle
- Release: 1979; 47 years ago
- Stable release: 14.1.2.0 / December 20, 2024; 22 months ago

Oracle Forms is a software product for creating screens that interact with an Oracle database. It has an IDE that includes an object navigator, property sheet, and code editor that uses PL/SQL. It was originally developed to run server-side in character-mode terminal sessions. It was ported to other platforms, including Windows, to function in a client–server environment. Later versions were ported to Java where it runs in a Java EE container and can integrate with Java, and web services that can be launched from a URL. Recent versions provide a means to run the forms from a desktop computer without requiring a browser.

The primary focus of Forms is to create data entry systems that access an Oracle database.

== How it works ==
Oracle Forms accesses the Oracle database and generates a screen that presents the data. The source form (*.fmb) is compiled into a platform-specific "executable" (*.fmx), that is run (interpreted) by the forms runtime module. The form is used to view and edit data in database-driven applications. Various GUI elements, such as buttons, menus, scrollbars, and graphics can be placed on the form. Source code may also be placed in library files (*.pll) which are compiled into library executables (*.plx) used at runtime.

The environment supplies built-in record creation, query, and update modes, each with its own default data manipulations. This minimizes the need to program common, and tedious operations, such as creating dynamic SQL, sensing changed fields, and locking rows.

As is normal with event driven interfaces, the software implements event-handling functions called triggers which are automatically invoked at critical steps in the processing of records, the receipt of keyboard strokes, and the receipt of mouse movements. Different triggers may be called before, during, and after each critical step.

Each trigger function is initially a stub, containing a default action or nothing. Programming Oracle Forms therefore generally consists of modifying the contents of these triggers in order to alter the default behavior. Some triggers, if provided by the programmer, replace the default action while others augment it.

As a result of this strategy, it is possible to create a number of default form layouts which possess complete database functionality yet contain no programmer-written code at all.

== History ==
Oracle Forms is sold, and released separately from the Oracle Database. However, major releases of an Oracle database usually result in a new major version of Oracle Forms to support new features in the database.

=== Interactive Application Facility (IAF) ===
Oracle Forms started as Interactive Application Facility (IAF), which had two main components: the compiler (Interactive Application Generator - IAG) and the runtime interpreter (Interactive Application Processor - IAP). Released with the first Oracle Database version 2 (there was no version 1), IAF provided a character mode interface to allow users to enter and query data from an Oracle database.

It was renamed to Fast Forms with Oracle Database version 4 and added an additional tool to help generate a default form to edit with IAG, the form editor.

It was renamed a third time to SQL*Forms version 2 along with the Oracle 5 database version.

=== Forms 2.x ===
Forms 2.0 included a forms design editor that included a screen painter.

This release was character-based (rather than GUI) so forms were developed and runtime typically in a terminal. The source file was an *.INP ASCII file and was edited using the screen painter, however the file was an ASCII file and editing this file directly in a text editor was a common practice due to the limitations of the form editor.

This version of Forms did not include the PL/SQL language and instead it used its own custom language based on trigger steps. The language was more primitive than the PL/SQL language that was available in SQL*Plus. The limited language was augmented by user exits that compiled language code linked to the binary of the Oracle-provided run-time.

Forms 2.3 was used as the basis for the Oracle Financials accounting package. As a result, 2.3 remained in use long after Forms 3 and 4 became available in order to support customer forms that were created to integrate with Oracle Financials.

=== Forms 3.x ===
Oracle Forms 3 was the first version to allow PL/SQL to be used within Forms triggers and procedures/SQL Functions could also be used as an undocumented feature.

Forms 3 was a character mode application and was primarily used in terminals such as Digital VT220 and PCs running Microsoft DOS. It could run under X but did not support any X interface-specific features such as checkboxes, so it was basically a character mode application running in a GUI window.

Although a mouse could be used to click on fields, there were no mouse specific triggers (such as when-mouse-double click) available in this release.

The source file was an *.INP ASCII file. The runtime file was an *.FRM binary file.

The IDE was greatly improved to allow editing of PL/SQL code, and this reduced the common practice of editing the INP source file directly.

Forms 3 automatically generated Forms triggers and code to support some database constraints such as primary keys and foreign keys. Constraints could be defined, but not enforced in the Oracle 6 database at this time, so Oracle used Forms 3 to claim that it supported constraints in its technology stack.

=== Forms 4.0 ===
Oracle Forms version 4.0 was the first true GUI based version of the product that supported GUI elements such as checkboxes and radio groups in the Forms editor and at runtime.

Although not publicly advertised, a character-based runtime was still available for certain customers on request.

The arrival of Microsoft Windows 3 and competitive products running under Windows forced Oracle to release this GUI version of Forms for commercial reasons. Forms 4.0 accompanied Oracle database version 6 with support for Microsoft Windows and X Windows.

A new IDE was introduced in this version. Each type of object had an editor window that was optimized for it, so the field editor looked quite different to the window editor. These would be abandoned in the next release and replaced with property sheets that were made popular with Visual Basic.

The 4.0 source files were *.FMB for forms, *.PLL for libraries and *.OLB for object libraries the 4.0 runtime files were *.FMX for forms, *.PLX for libraries. *.OLB files were compiled into the FMX.

The Oracle Financials software suite did not use this version of Forms and instead continued to use Forms 2.3.

=== Forms 4.5 ===
Oracle Forms version 4.5 was really a major release rather than a "point release" of 4.0 despite its ".5" version number. It was named 4.5 in order to meet contractual obligations to support Forms 4 for a period of time for certain clients so it could market 4.5 as being a patch to 4.0, even though a full install was required, rather than upgrading 4.0 to 4.5 with a patch.

This version contained significant functional changes and a brand-new IDE, replacing the IDE that was introduced in 4.0. It added GUI-based triggers, and provided a modern IDE with an object navigator, property sheets and code editor. This design had become popular at the time due to its use by Microsoft Visual Basic.

The development environment has changed very little since this release, so a software developer that is experienced with Forms 4.5 can easily work on any version of Forms up to the latest version.

=== Forms 5.x ===
Oracle Forms version 5 accompanied Oracle database version 7.

=== Forms 6.x ===
Forms 6 was released with Oracle 8.0 database and was re-released as Forms 6i with Oracle 8i. This version was basically Forms 4.5 with some extra wizards and bug-fixes. It included the facility to run inside a web server. A Forms Server was supplied to solve the problem of adapting Oracle Forms to a three-tier, browser-based delivery, without incurring major changes in its programmatic interface. The complex, highly interactive form interface was provided by a Java applet which communicated directly with the Forms server. However the web version did not work very well over HTTP. A fix from Forms 9i was retrofitted to later versions of 6i to address this.

The naming and numbering system applied to Oracle Forms underwent several changes due to marketing factors, without altering the essential nature of the product. The ability to code in Java, as well as PL/SQL, was added in this period.

=== Forms 9.x ===
The version number jumped straight from 6 to 9 in order to keep the number the same as the Oracle database version released at a similar time.

Forms 9i included many bug fixes to 6i and was known as a good stable version. Support was removed for Windows client-server runtime, character-based interfaces and instead the three-tier, web browser-based user interface is the only deployment option. The ability to import java classes means that it can act as a web service client.

Starting with this release the version number of Oracle Forms moving forward would keep in sync with the Oracle database version. As a result, version 8 as skipped, and the version number jumped to 9.

After this release, there were very few product changes made besides keeping the version number in sync with the Oracle database.

=== Forms 10.x ===
Forms 10g is actually Forms version 9.0.4, so is merely a rebadged Forms 9i.

=== Forms 11.x ===
Forms 11 introduced advancements such as external events, JavaScript support in Release 1, and Access Manager, Real User Experience Interaction (RUEI), and performance monitoring in Release 2. These improvements expanded functionality and interaction capabilities, utilizing Oracle AQ to enable seamless interaction with JMS.

=== Forms 12.x ===
Java Web Start allows users to run Oracle Forms applications without having a parent web browser. Although a browser may be used to initially obtain the application's Java Web Start launcher file (.Jalp), the browser is not responsible for hosting the application and can be closed after the application has been started. JWS supports Internet Explorer, Firefox ESR, Chrome, Edge.

=== Forms 14.x ===
Forms 14.1.2.0 was released on December 20, 2024. There was no Forms 13, that version number was intentionally skipped due to 13 being considered an unlucky number in some cultures. New features include modernised widgets and support for accessing REST data sources.

== Version Summary ==
Name	Version	(*1) Database	Character/GUI	Comments
IAF		2	Character	No IDE
FastForms+IAG		4	Character	
SQL*Forms	2	5	Character	New IDE, No PL/SQL, User Exits, INP ASCII File, FRM Runtime File
SQL*Forms	2.3	5	Character	Runtime improvements
SQL*Forms	3	6	Character	Major Rewrite, Improved IDE, PL/SQL included, X Support, Generate code to enforce constraints
Oracle Forms	4.0	6-7	GUI / Character	Major Rewrite, New IDE, FMB source binary file, FMX Runtime, optimized for Client-Server. New interface is slow, buggy and not popular with client base.
Oracle Forms	4.5	7	GUI / Character	Major Rewrite, New IDE based on Object Navigator & Property Sheets. Good release, fast, popular with client base. Oracle wanted customers to upgrade from v4 quickly because v4 was very buggy and Oracle was contracted to support v4 for a period of time for some large, important customers. So, Oracle named this release 4.5 (rather than 5) which allowed Oracle to claim continued support for v4. This allowed some customers who were locked into v4 for the life of their project to upgrade from v4 to v4.5 by claiming that this was a patch release even though it was clearly a major release.
Oracle Forms	5	7	GUI / Character	
Oracle Forms	6	8	GUI / Character	Forms Server / Web Forms introduced. Client-Server still available and used by most clients. Forms Server mode is slow, buggy and uses a lot of memory per session.
Oracle Forms	6i	8	GUI / Character	
Oracle Forms	9i (*2)	9i	GUI	Client-Server runtime removed leaving Forms Server (Web Interface) as only runtime option. Major Changes at the Server Level, more effective communication between user browser and the server.
Oracle Forms	10g	10g	GUI	This is a Forms 9 release (9.0.4.0.19). Renamed externally to indicate support for 10g database. Menu-Help-About displays v9.0.4.0.19. Not forward compatible with 10gr2 (can't open 10gr2 forms in 10g/904)
Oracle Forms	10gR2	10gR2	GUI	version 10.1.2.0.2 - registry home key moved. Max NUMBER length reduced from 40 to 38
Oracle Forms	11g	11g	GUI	version 11.1.1.X External Events, JavaScript
Oracle Forms	11gR2	11gR2	GUI	version 11.1.2.X Oracle Access Manager Integration, Performance and Monitoring, Real User Experience Interaction
Oracle Forms	12c	12c	GUI	
Oracle Forms	14	23ai	GUI	Adds modernised widgets and support for accessing REST data sources.

(*1) Each version of Oracle Forms can connect to numerous versions of the ORACLE database and is sold and released separately from the ORACLE Database. Oracle Forms is generally forward and backward compatible with the Oracle database - for example: Oracle Forms 9 can connect to at least Oracle 8,9, 10 and 11. The database versions listed here are the primary version that was available at the time of the Form release.

(*2) Oracle products have historically followed their own release-numbering and naming conventions. This changed with Oracle RDBMS 9i release when Oracle Corporation started to standardize Oracle Forms (and Reports and Developer) to use the same major version number as the database. This explains the jump in Oracle Forms versions from 6i to 9i (there was no v7 or v8). With the 2024 release of Forms 14, the linkage between Forms and Database versioning has been discontinued again.

== Oracle Designer ==
Oracle Designer was a Computer aided software engineering (CASE) tool that was sold by Oracle. It was able to generate various software modules including Oracle Forms and Oracle Reports. The last release of Oracle Designer was in 2010 and it has since been discontinued.

== Current status ==
Whilst Oracle's preferred approach for new development is its Java based Oracle Application Development Framework or Oracle Application Express, Oracle's development tools statement of direction is quite clear in its commitment to continuing to support Oracle Forms and continue to develop and enhance it in the following areas:

- Making the upgrade to the web and to new releases as smooth as possible
- Allowing Forms and Reports applications to take full advantage of the application server services and inter-operate with Java EE applications.
- Integrating modern mobile solutions by exposing data through other technologies like Oracle Visual Builder (Cloud) or Oracle APEX (DB) without abandon their current Oracle Forms investment.

As of January 2025, according to the Oracle Lifetime Support Policy, Premier Support for Fusion Middleware 14c (14.1.x), which includes the current version of Oracle Forms, is scheduled to conclude in December 2029. Extended Support will subsequently be available, with an end date set for December 2032. Additionally, while migration from Oracle Forms to Oracle APEX is possible within the Oracle ecosystem, as both technologies are based on Oracle Database, it is not an automatic process. Transitioning to APEX requires planning, redevelopment, and adaptation to APEX’s architecture and functionalities.
