= DronaHQ =

Indian software company

- Type: Private
- Industry: Information Technology
- Founded: 2007
- Founder: Divyesh Kharade, Jinen Dedhia
- Headquarters: Mumbai, India
- Products: DronaHQ
- Number of employees: 100
- Parent: Deltecs InfoTech Pvt. Ltd.
- Website: www.dronahq.com

DronaHQ, is a low code app development platform, from Deltecs InfoTech Pvt. Ltd., Mumbai, India that helps to build internal tools, and business apps. The platform advertises multi-experience output (Mobile & Web) with visual builders, online database, code editors, prebuilt templates, configurable workflows, and analytics. It allows users to build applications on top of data sources.

DronaHQ has announced the launch of an enhanced Workflow builder.

== History ==
While working at Wipro Technologies, Jinen Dedhia & Divyesh Kharade saw students studying preparatory exam materials during commutes in 2005. They worked out a mobile learning solution that allowed word lists to be pushed to mobile handsets. The team continued delivering mobile learning services until they launched their own company, Delta Technologies. (later renamed to Deltecs InfoTech Pvt. Ltd. in 2007)

The same year, Tata McGraw-Hill approached Deltecs to develop mobile learning products for a range of exam-based materials. This project was called Mobile Ads (MAD). As the market for mobile learning grew, the team started work on a common mobile platform that could support multiple sources of content, called DRONA.

In 2010, Drona VCAST was renamed to Drona Mobile when it supported multiple formats including video, audio, documents, presentations and more. The same year, DRONA Mobile was also launched for iPhone, iPad and Android devices.
