= Ramnika Gupta =

Indian writer, activist, and politician (1930–2019)

Ramnika Gupta (April 22, 1930 – March 26, 2019) was an Indian writer, activist and politician. She was the founder and President of Ramnika Foundation, member of the CPI(M), a tribal rights champion, former trade union leader, politician, writer and editor. She was the coordinator of the All India Tribal Literary forum. She was a Member of the Bihar Legislative Assembly from 1979–1985.

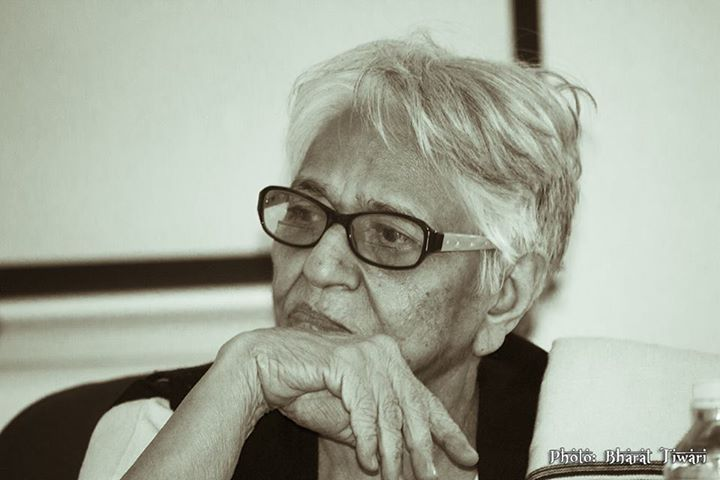
Ramnika Gupta

== Life ==
Gupta was born in Punjab on April 22, 1930. Her father was an army officer. Her husband was a civil servant and the couple had two daughters and one son.

Gupta died in Delhi on March 26, 2019 at the age of 88.

== Works ==
Gupta was an activist for labour rights, women rights, Dalit and tribal rights focusing on coal mine workers of Jharkhand. Some of her published works are on these topics. Her autobiography is titled 'Haadsey aur Aaphudri'. She published a novel called Sita Mausi, a collection of stories titled Bahu Juthai. Some of her poetry works are Tum Kaun, Til Til Nootan, Main Azaad Hui, Aadam Se Aaadmi Tak, Vigyapan Bantey Kavi. In prose she has written Dalit Hastakshep, Kalam Aur Kudaal Ke Bahaane, Dalit Chetna, Assam Narsanhaar - Ek Rapat, Dakshin Vaam Ke Katgharey, Rashtriya Ekta
