= FDM Group =

International professional services company

FDM Group Limited
- Formerly: FDM Group Plc (2005–2010); F.D.M. Group Plc (1998–2005); The Longueville Group Plc (1995–1998); Flavell Divett International Plc (1991–1995); Teamsquare Plc (1990–1991)
- Company type: Public
- Traded as: LSE: FDM
- Industry: IT Services
- Founded: September 25, 1990; 35 years ago
- Headquarters: London, United Kingdom
- Number of locations: 18
- Key people: David Lister (Chairman); Rod Flavell (CEO); Sheila Flavell CBE (Chief Operating Officer)
- Services: Training; recruitment; management consulting; outsourcing
- Revenue: ▲£334.0 million (2023)
- Operating income: ▲£55.0 million (2023)
- Net income: ▲£40.8 million (2023)
- Number of employees: 5,500 (2024)
- Website: fdmgroup.com

FDM Group Limited is a British multinational information technology (IT) consulting company headquartered in London, United Kingdom. It is composed mostly of university graduates, returners to work and ex-military personnel, who are trained in the FDM Group Skills Labs before working as consultants for one of FDM Group's clients, primarily financial institutions and banks around the world. It is listed on the London Stock Exchange.

== History ==
The company was founded in Brighton by Rod Flavell, who became chief executive, and his wife, Jacqueline Flavell, in 1990. They were joined by Brian Divett, who became chairman, and Julian Divett, who became chief operating officer, and the firm was named Flavell Divett. The company focused on IT recruitment until acquiring Mountfield Software in 1995. In 1998 the name changed to FDM Group to reflect this acquisition and the company began hiring, training and placing their own consultants (called Mounties) on-site with their clients.

In April 2005, FDM Group floated on the Alternative Investment Market, raising £3 million net for the company. By 2009, the company completed a management buyout led by Rod and Sheila Flavell and Andy Brown, with the support of Inflexion, to once again bring the company private. In June 2014, FDM listed on the UK Stock Market, this time valued at £308 million on the London Stock Exchange.

Concerns have been raised over the contracts signed by the company's trainees. In 2018, Frank Field, a Member of Parliament in the UK, wrote a letter to government's business secretary, asking for an official inquiry into their business practices. The letter also raised "significant doubts" about whether the £20,000 fees imposed if candidates leave the programme before their two-year period reflected the true costs of training. The scheme was likened to indentured servitude. Legal challenges were raised against both FDM and Capita, another outsourcing organisation, over the fees. One former trainee of FDM told The Guardian that they did not enjoy the job in which they were placed, that the training included general advice, such as how to write emails, and that there was "so much room for manipulation and coercion in the contract".

In 2018, the Ministry of Labour in Ontario, Canada ruled that the fee charged by FDM to a worker who left a job at the Royal Bank of Canada before their contracted period was illegal under the Employment Standards Act. Following the ruling, FDM Group reworded their contract but retained the fee.

== Services ==
In March 2024, FDM Group underwent a brand refresh. As part of their new identity and offerings, FDM unveiled five specialist practices to deliver business and tech consultancy services. The five practice areas are: Software Engineering, Data & Analytics, IT Operations, Change & Transformation and Risk, Regulation & Compliance.

== Initiatives ==
FDM Group has a Women in IT initiative focused on hiring and inspiring women to pursue jobs in STEM fields. As part of their efforts, they have sponsored the 2013, 2014, 2015 and 2016 everywoman in Technology Awards in London. FDM Group sponsored the Wall Street Rocks charity concert.
