= EGL (programming language) =

Programming language developed by IBM

EGL (Enterprise Generation Language)
- Developer: IBM
- License: Eclipse Public License
- Website: www.eclipse.org/edt/

EGL (Enterprise Generation Language) is a programming technology designed to meet the challenges of modern (at the time of its design), multi-platform application development by providing a common language and programming model across languages, frameworks, and runtime platforms.

Originally developed by IBM, it was later donated to the Eclipse Software Foundation and maintained as the EDT (EGL Development Tools) open source project under the Eclipse Public License (EPL). The project was proposed for termination in 2014 due to insufficient activity in the previous two years, and was effectively archived in 2017.

== Overview ==
The language borrows concepts familiar to anyone using statically typed languages like Java, COBOL, C, etc. However, it borrows the concept of stereotype from Unified Modeling Language (UML) that is not typically found in statically typed programming languages. In a nutshell, EGL is a higher-level, universal application development language.

EGL is similar in syntax to other common languages so it can be learned by application developers with similar previous programming background. EGL application development abstractions shield programmers from the technical interfaces of systems and middleware allowing them to focus on building business functionality. EGL applications and services are written, tested and debugged at the EGL source level, and once they are satisfactorily functionally tested they can be compiled into COBOL, Java, or JavaScript code to support deployment of business applications that can run in any of the following environments:

- Platforms with a Java virtual machine, such as Microsoft Windows, Linux, and UNIX, for example in the context of a Java EE servlet container (IBM WebSphere Application Server, Apache Tomcat, GlassFish)
- IBM System z: CICS Transaction Server, IMS, z/OS Batch, UNIX System Services, WebSphere Application Server, z/VSE, Linux
- IBM Power Systems: IBM i, IBM WebSphere Application Server, Apache Tomcat, Integrated Web Application Server for i
- Web browsers supporting JavaScript, such as Internet Explorer, Firefox, and Safari, for Ajax rich web applications

== Code examples ==
=== Program ===
An EGL Program part is a generatable logic part with one entry point. Each Program part contains a main() function, which represents the logic that runs at program start up. A program can include other functions and can access functions that are outside of the program. The function main() can invoke those other functions. Program functions are composed of a set of EGL statements, variables, and constants.

Program HelloWorld

	const GREETING string = "Hello, ";
    
	function main()
		myName string = "John";
		sayHello(myName);
	end

	function sayHello(name String in)
		SysLib.writeStdOut(GREETING + name + "!");
	end

end

=== Record ===
An EGL Record part defines a set of data elements. In this example, a record with the name CustomerRecord is defined with 6 fields.

Record CustomerRecord type BasicRecord
	customerNumber INT;            
	customerName STRING;
	customerAddr1 STRING;
	customerAddr2 STRING;
	customerAddr3 STRING;
	customerBalance MONEY;
end

EGL has a specialized type of record called SQLRecord that is used to exchange data with a relational database.

record Employee type sqlRecord { tableNames =[["Employee"]], keyItems =[EMPNO]}
    EMPNUMBER string{ column = "EMPNO", maxLen = 6};
    FIRSTNME string{ sqlVariableLen = yes, maxLen = 12};
    MIDINIT string{ isSqlNullable = yes, maxLen = 1};
    LASTNAME string{ sqlVariableLen = yes, maxLen = 15};
    DEPT string{ column = "WORKDEPT", isSqlNullable = yes, maxLen = 3};
    PHONENO string{ isSqlNullable = yes, maxLen = 4};
    HIREDATE date{ isSqlNullable = yes};
end

- In this example, the record Employee is bound to a table (or view) named Employee.

=== Service ===
An EGL Service part contains public functions meant to be accessed from other applications or systems. In this example, a service with two functions is defined.

package com.mycompany.services;

service EmployeeService

    function getEmployees() returns(Employee[])
        records Employee[0]; // define an empty array of records
        get records; // retrieve records from the database
        return (records); // return the records       
    end
    
    function addEmployee(emp Employee in) returns (boolean)
    	try
    		add remp;
    		return (true);
    	onException (ex AnyException)
    		return (false);
    	end
    end

end

- In EGL, code is organized in packages (like Java (programming language))
- The first function, getEmployees, returns an array of records populated from the records in a database.
- The second function, addEmployee adds a new record to the database and returns a true or false depending on whether the record was added successfully.

=== RUIHandler ===
The main component of a Rich UI application is a Rich UI handler part. These parts are generated into JavaScript.

package com.mycompany.ui;

import com.mycompany.services.Employee;
import com.mycompany.services.EmployeeService;
import dojo.widgets.DojoGrid;
import dojo.widgets.DojoGridColumn;

handler EmployeeView type RUIhandler { initialUI = [ grid ], 
                                       onConstructionFunction = start, 
                                       cssFile = "main.css" }

    grid DojoGrid { behaviors = [ ], headerBehaviors = [ ], columns = [
                    new DojoGridColumn { displayName = "First Name", name = "FIRSTNAME" },
                    new DojoGridColumn { displayName = "Last Name", name = "LASTNAME" },
                    new DojoGridColumn { displayName = "Salary", name = "SALARY" }
            ] };

    function start()
        svc EmployeeService { };
        call svc.getEmployees () returning to displayEmployees;
    end

    function displayEmployees(retResult Employee [ ] in)
        grid.data = retResult as any [ ];
    end
    
end

== Web 2.0 with EGL ==
In December 2008, IBM introduced new technology, EGL Rich UI, to simplify the creation of Web 2.0-style rich web applications. This technology simplifies development by hiding the complexities of Ajax, JavaScript, REST, and SOAP from the developer, which enables them to focus on the business requirement and not on the underlying technologies.

== Commercial products ==
EGL programming tools are available as an Eclipse-based commercial product, the Rational Business Developer and also in the EGL edition of Rational Developer for System z.

EGL is a target language for modernization of legacy applications because of the language semantics affinity with procedural languages and legacy 4th generation languages:

- a set of conversion tools available within the Rational Business Developer product provide automated the conversion from older and stabilized IBM and Informix 4th generation languages
- a set of IBM service offerings and complementary products (Rational Migration Extension for Natural, Rational Migration Extension for System i, Rational Migration Extension for CA-products) provide the ability to convert from Software AG Natural, IBM RPG, CA Cool:Gen and CA Ideal/Datacom to EGL

Tools for searching large EGL code bases, comparing individual EGL files for changes, and detecting duplicated code are available from Semantic Designs
