= Synon =

Defunct British software company

- Industry: Development tools for IBM midrange
- Founded: 1984
- Defunct: 1998
- Fate: acquired
- Successor: Sterling Software
- Headquarters: London
- Key people: Simon Williams, Founder and CEO
- Products: Synon/2, Obsydian

Synon was a software company which, at its height, dominated the worldwide market for third-party application development tools for the IBM i (formerly AS/400) platform. Its products continue to be used in that sector today, distributed and supported by Broadcom Inc.

== Chronology ==
Synon Ltd was founded in London in 1984 by Simon Williams (CEO), Melinda Horton (COO) and Nick Knowles (CTO) with the objective of developing an application generator for the IBM System/38 platform. They were soon joined by Simon Haigh (VP Sales).

Synon's first product was Synon/1, a programming productivity toolkit for the System/38, launched in 1985. In the same year the company appointed its first overseas distributors, in Australia and Norway.

Synon's flagship product, Synon/2 was launched in 1986 and became an immediate success with System/38 users. The same year, Chris Herron, formerly CEO of Fusion, along with Patrick Batty of Toronto, and Gerard Wolf of Chicago, set up Synon Inc, Synon's US sales and marketing subsidiary, in Larkspur, California. Synon also established a worldwide distribution channel with subsidiaries in France, Germany, Australia, Hong Kong and Japan.

- In 1987, Synon played a key role alongside IBM at the UK launch of its AS/400 platform. The AS/400 version of Synon/2 was named Synon/2E.
- In 1989, Synon, along with Bachman, Intersolv, KnowledgeWare and Systematica, was chosen by IBM to be at the heart of AD/Cycle, its framework for application development and CASE. IBM later acquired an equity stake in Synon.
- In 1990, French Connection sold its equity stake to General Atlantic Partners and TA Associates, two US VCs. As a condition of the transaction, Synon moved its HQ to Larkspur and became a Delaware corporation, changing its name to Synon Corporation. Shortly afterwards, Chris Herron became CEO. Simon Williams, who remained based in the UK, continued as Chairman and CTO.
- In 1990, Technicolor Rome following the vision of IT Director: Vincenzo Compagnoni, used Synon (at that time, a pioneer technology), to develop its entire information system (6,000 RPG programs) computerising the whole Film Laboratory supply chain and demonstrating the consistency of CASE TOOL technologies.
- In 1991, Synon launched Synon Model Applications, an accounting package developed using Synon/2E. In the same year, the company won the Queen's Awards for Technology and for Export, becoming one of only a handful of companies ever to win both awards in the same year.
- In 1992, Simon Williams, believing that the company was in danger of missing the client/server technology wave, left Synon together with Melinda Horton to establish Dysys, a self-funded UK start-up whose object was to develop a client/server, cross-platform successor to Synon/2E. In 1993 Williams and Horton sold Dysys to Synon, and returned to the fold. Their new product, Obsydian, was launched by Synon in 1994.
- In 1994, Synon/PE (Performance Expert) was created by Lou Kurrelmeyer and added to the Synon product line as a royalty product. Synon/PE analyzed 2E design models and suggested/automatically made corrections that reduced resource utilization by up to 600% when comparing end results of the executing application with starting results.
- By 1997, Synon's revenue was $80 million, with around 6,000 customers worldwide.
- In 1998, Synon was acquired by Sterling Software of Plano, Texas. Sterling continued to distribute and support Synon/2E and Obsydian as COOL:2E and COOL:Plex. La Crosse Management Systems of La Crosse, Wisconsin acquired Synon Model Applications from Sterling and continues to distribute it as La Crosse Financials.
- In 2000, Sterling was acquired by Computer Associates, which continued to distribute and develop Synon/2E and Obsydian as CA 2E and CA Plex.
- In 2018, Computer Associates (by then CA Technologies Inc.) was acquired by Broadcom Inc. Broadcom continues to distribute Synon/2E and Obsydian as CA 2E and CA Plex.

Simon Williams went on to develop the Associative Model of Data and to found Lazysoft.

== Technology ==
As early as 1986, Synon pioneered the approach to development which in early 2005 became known as Architected Rapid Application Development (ARAD). Such tools use abstract patterns as building blocks to automatically generate the components of an application.

In Synon/2, developers use a specialized language to define an application's data model and the rules that ensure its integrity. They then select from a set of around 30 pre-built program design templates which perform edit, display and print functions in full screen, multi-line and transaction (full screen header above a multi-line detail) modes. Developers may further specialise the procedural logic of the selected templates and link templates together by using action diagrams.

The tool then automatically instantiates the specialized templates over the data model and generates high-level language code in RPG or COBOL without any further developer intervention. It also generates the SQL or DDS code to define the necessary database tables and views.

Synon kept precise productivity metrics during the internal development of its SMA accounting system. In total, 2,385 days of effort were expended on development and QA over a 14-month period, which resulted in the creation of 2.42 million lines of HLL code (excluding comments) in 2,081 programs. This is equivalent to the production of 1,016 lines of fully tested and documented code per person per day. The all-in, fully loaded cost (including management, design and end-user documentation) was £416 per program.

Synon/2 was also ahead of its time by adopting a strictly object oriented approach to the programs that it generated. For instance, programmers could not use native HLL commands to operate on database tables: instead, all physical database creates, changes and retrievals were encapsulated within individual templates, which were in turn evoked by generated programs. Thus programs could be automatically regenerated with no manual intervention following changes to the structure of the database.

In 2001, CA introduced an add-on tool to CA 2E called Web Option, which allows 2E customers to web-enable their existing applications and to run those applications (which were originally designed for an IBM 'green-screen') inside a standard web browser.

Obsydian follows the same general principles as Synon/2, with the important exception that developers can create and re-use their own abstract design templates. The CA Plex toolset also operates web and client-server applications, and generates in C#, C++, Java, RPG/III and IV/ILE IBM RPG and is multi-platform.
