= Gupta Technologies =

American computer software company

Gupta Technologies, LLC
- Industry: Software
- Founded: 1984; 42 years ago
- Founder: Umang Gupta
- Fate: Acquired by Unify Corporation in 2006, currently part of OpenText
- Successor: Unify Corporation, Now OpenText
- Headquarters: Roseville, Placer County, California
- Products: SQL relational database management system

Gupta Technologies, LLC was a software development company based in Menlo Park, San Mateo County, California. It was later renamed to Centura Software in the late 1990s and then to Halo Technology Holdings, Inc in 2005. It was acquired by Unify Corporation in 2006.

Its principal products are the SQL relational database management system SQLBase, a mobile HTML5 enterprise development system called TD Mobile and a rapid application development system called Team Developer (also known as SQLWindows). The company is considered as the provider of the first client/server relational database software that would run on personal computers (PC), rather than mini computers.

== Company history ==
The company was founded in 1984 by Umang Gupta, a former vice president at Oracle Corporation. Gupta's first product was SQLBase, followed by SQLWindows, which combined SQLBase with a graphical user interface and programming language for creating business applications. SQLWindows was one of the first GUI development tools for Microsoft Windows. The company went public in 1993 (NASDAQ: GPTA).

The name of the company was changed to Centura Software in the late 1990s. In February 2001 Centura was taken over by the Platinum Equity investment company. Centura Software filed for Chapter 11 Bankruptcy in August 2001, and the United States Securities and Exchange Commission revoked the registration of Centura's common stock in December 2004. After the bankruptcy, some assets were kept by a reborn Gupta Technologies LLC.

In January 2005 Gupta Technologies, LLC was bought by another investor, Warp Technology Holdings, Inc. In May 2005 the company changed its name to Halo Technology Holdings, Inc. In September 2006 the company was acquired by Unify Corporation. In June 2010 Unify announced its merger with Daegis, a US company that provides software for electronic discovery in litigation matters.

In November 2012 the Unify database and development tools division was renamed back to Gupta Technologies.

In 2015 Gupta was acquired by OpenText.
