= Oracle Reports =

Software

Oracle Reports is a tool for developing reports against data stored in an Oracle database. Oracle Reports consists of Oracle Reports Developer (a component of the Oracle Developer Suite) and Oracle Application Server Reports Services (a component of the Oracle Application Server).

The report output can be delivered directly to a printer or saved in the following formats: HTML, RTF, PDF, XML, Microsoft Excel
