= List of mergers and acquisitions by SAP =

German software company

This is a list of mergers and acquisitions by German software company SAP.

== List ==
Acquisitions (1991–now):

Acquisition number	Acquired company	Acquisition date	Specialty	Country of origin	Acquisition costs
80	Dremio	May 2026	Agentic AI	USA	
79	Reltio	May 2026	Master data management (MDM)	USA	€1.0 b
78	Prior Labs	May 2026	Artificial intelligence	Germany	~€650 m
77	SmartRecruiters	Sep 2025	AI powered recruiting	USA	
76	WalkMe	Jun 2024	Digital Adoption Platform (DAP)	USA	$1.5 b
75	LeanIX	Sep 2023	Enterprise architecture management	Germany	
74	Taulia	(January 2022)	Working capital management	USA	
73	AppGyver	(February 2021)	No-code development platform	Finland	
72	Signavio	(January 2021)	Collaborative Business Process Design, Management and Analysis	Germany	$1b est.
71	Emarsys	Oct 2020	Omnichannel marketing	Austria	
70	Qualtrics	Nov 2018	Collect, Manage, act on Experience data	USA	$8.0b
69	Contextor	Nov 2018	Robotic Process Automation	France	
68	Coresystems	Jun 2018	Platform for field service management	Switzerland	
67	CallidusCloud	Jan 2018	Sales Performance Management Tool	USA	$2.4 b
66	Recast.ai	Jan 2018	Conversational User Experience Technology (chatbot)	France	
65	Gigya	Sep 2017	Customer Identity Management	Israel	$350m
64	Abakus	Dec 2016	Marketing attribution	USA	
63	Plat.One	Oct 2016	IoT	USA	
62	Altiscale	Aug 2016	Big data and Hadoop Hosting	USA	$125m+
61	Fedem Technology	Jun 2016	IoT	Norway	
60	MeLLmo Inc. (Roambi)	Feb 2016	Mobile Business Intelligence	USA	
59	Concur Technologies	Sep 2014	Travel and Expense Management	USA	$8.3b
58	SeeWhy	May 2014	Behavioural target marketing	USA	$1.1b
57	Fieldglass	Mar 2014	Contingent labour and services	USA	
56	KXEN	Oct 2013	Predictive analytics	France	
55	hybris	May 2013	E-Commerce Solutions	Switzerland	$1.5b
54	Camilion	Mar 2013	Insurance solutions	Canada	
53	SmartOps	Feb 2013	Inventory optimization	USA	
52	Ticket-Web	Feb 2013	Ticket systems and special CRM solutions for sports and entertainment	Germany	
51	Ariba	Oct 2012	Supplier network	USA	$4.3b
50	Syclo	Jun 2012	Mobile asset management	USA	
49	datango	Jan 2012	Electronic performance support technologies	Germany	
48	SuccessFactors	Dec 2011	Human Capital Management	USA	$3.4b
47	Right Hemisphere	Sep 2011	3D visualization	USA	
46	Crossgate	Sep 2011	B2B eCommerce	Germany	
45	Secude	Mar 2011	Security software (Not the whole company, only some assets were acquired)	Germany	
44	Cundus	Dec 2010	Disclosure Management	Germany	
43	Sybase	May 2010	Database, middleware, mobile software	USA	$5.8b
42	TechniData	May 2010	Environmental, Health and Safety	Germany	
41	SAF	Sep 2009	Inventory Management	Switzerland	$91m
40	Highdeal	May 2009	High-volume billing	France	
39	Visiprise	Jul 2008	Manufacturing Execution	USA	
38	Saicon INC	Oct 2014	US Recruitment	India	
37	BusinessObjects	Oct 2007	Business Intelligence	France	$6.78b
36	Yasu Technologies Pvt. Ltd.	Oct 2007	Business Rules Management Software	India	
35	Wicom Communications	May 2007	Internet Communication software	Finland	
34	MaXware	May 2007	Identity software	Norway	
33	Outlooksoft	May 2007	Planning & consolidation	USA	
32	Pilot Software	Feb 2007	Strategy Management software	USA	~$200m
31	Factory Logic	Dec 2006	Lean scheduling and supply synchronisation	USA	
30	Praxis Software Solutions	Jul 2006	Web-based CRM and eCommerce	USA	
29	Frictionless Commerce	May 2006	SRM software	USA	
28	Virsa Systems	Apr 2006	Compliance solutions	USA	
27	SAP Systems Integration	Dec 2005	Consulting services	Germany	
26	Callixa	Nov 2005	Enterprise Integration Information software	USA	
25	Khimetrics	Nov 2005	retail software	USA	
24	Triversity	Sep 2005	POS software	Canada	
23	Lighthammer	Jun 2005	Manufacturing Intelligence and Collaborative Manufacturing	USA	
22	DCS Quantum	Feb 2005	Automotive Dealer Management	United Kingdom	
21	TomorrowNow	Jan 2005	Grey market support	USA	
20	ilytix	Jan 2005	SAP BusinessOne Business Intelligence	Norway	
19	A2i	Jul 2004	Master Data Management	USA	
18	SPM Technologies	Dec 2003	IT architecture consulting	Germany	
17	DCW Software	Jul 2003	OS/400 Applications	Germany	
16	Guimachine	Dec 2002	NetWeaver Visual Composer toolkit	USA	
15	IMHC	May 2001	Integrated managed health care from IDS	USA	
14	Expression	May 2002	Real-time file sharing	?	
13	Topmanage	Feb 2002	SAP BusinessOne Suite	Israel	
12	Paynet International AG	Dec 2001	Invoice Processing	Germany	
11	COPA GmbH	Nov 2001	Beverage industry consulting	Germany	
10	Infinite Data Structures	May 2001	Trade Management / CRM	USA	
9	Toptier	Mar 2001	Enterprise Information Portal and Integration Infrastructure	USA	~$400m
8	Prescient Consulting	Feb 2000	Consulting services	USA	
7	In-Q-My Technologies GmbH	2000	J2EE Server	Bulgaria	
6	Campbell Software	1999	Workforce Management	USA	
5	AMC Development	1998	Call Center telephony integration software	USA	
4	OFEK-Tech	1998	Warehousing and distribution centre software	Israel	
3	Kiefer & Veittinger	1997	Sales force Applications	Germany	
2	Dacos	1994	Retail solution	Germany	
1	Steeb	1991	Software and Consulting Services	Germany	
