= Taulia =

Taulia may refer to:

- Taulia Tagovailoa, American football quarterback
- Taulia (company), an American company acquired by SAP

== See also ==
- Greensill Capital#Insolvency
