= Virsa =

Virsa may refer to:

== People ==
- Virsa Singh (born 1933), Indian athlete
- Virsa Singh Valtoha, Indian politician

== Other ==
- Virsa (film), a 2010 Indian film by Pankaj Batra
- Virsa Systems, compliance software company, now part of SAP Labs
