= Ed Oates =

American businessman (born 1946)

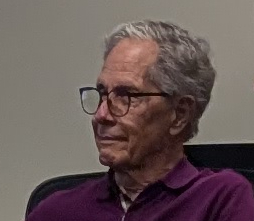
- Oates in 2024
- Born: Edward Oates; 1946 (age 79–80)
- Education: San Jose State University (BA)
- Known for: Co-founder of Oracle Corporation

Edward A. Oates (born 1946) is an American businessman. He co-founded Software Development Labs in August 1977 with Larry Ellison and Bob Miner. Software Development Labs later became Oracle Corporation.

== Education and early employment ==
Ed Oates graduated with a BA in mathematics from San Jose State University in 1968, and worked at Singer, the US Army Personnel Information Systems Command (PERSINSCOM) (drafted), Ampex, and Memorex before co-founding Oracle.

== Audible Difference ==
After retiring from Oracle in 1996, Oates purchased a high-end home theater store, Audible Difference. Oates' clients included his ex-partner Larry Ellison and Steve Jobs. In 1999 he sold Audible Difference.

== Other affiliations ==
Oates volunteers time on the board of directors of the San Francisco Zoological Society and the Tower Foundation Board of San Jose State University.

== Personal life ==
In his spare time, Oates skis, builds H0 scale model railroads, and does video work for the Woodside Priory School Theater. He also plays guitar in the band Choc'd, and participated at Rock and Roll Fantasy Camp.
