= Oracle Corp. v. SAP AG =

US copyright infringement lawsuit (decided 2011)

Oracle Corporation v. SAP AG
- Court: United States District Court for the Northern District of California
- Full case name: Oracle Corp., et al v. SAP AG
- Decided: September 1, 2011
- Docket nos.: 4:07-cv-01658

Court membership
- Judges sitting: Phyllis J. Hamilton; Magistrate Judge Edward M. Chen

Keywords
- Copyright infringement

Oracle Corp v. SAP AG, No. 4:07-cv-01658, was a United States District Court for the Northern District of California case in which Oracle sued SAP, alleging that SAP had engaged in copyright infringement by downloading thousands of copyrighted documents and programs from Oracle's Customer Connection website. SAP admitted that its subsidiary TomorrowNow had infringed Oracle's copyrights and a jury awarded Oracle record-high damages in the amount of $1.3 billion. Judge Phyllis Hamilton later vacated the jury's verdict, which was based on the calculation of a hypothetical license, and granted SAP's motion for a new trial dependent on Oracle rejecting a remittitur of $272 million. In November 2014, an appeals court ruled for $356.7 million in damages, a decision which was accepted by both parties.

== Background ==
TomorrowNow was a company based in Bryan, Texas, which specialized in offering third-party technical service and support for enterprise software systems, including systems from PeopleSoft and JD Edwards. TomorrowNow was acquired by SAP AG in 2005 and became a wholly owned subsidiary of SAP.

PeopleSoft acquired JD Edwards in 2003 and then Oracle Corporation acquired PeopleSoft in 2005.

On March 22, 2007, Oracle filed a complaint with the United States District Court for the Northern District of California accusing SAP and TomorrowNow of corporate theft on a "grand scale". According to Oracle, TomorrowNow had downloaded thousands of documents and programs from Oracle's Customer Connection technical support website. Downloads were performed using credentials from Oracle customers whose support contract either already had or were about to expire. In addition, TomorrowNow had downloaded copyrighted support material for which the customers did not hold a license, and thus, were not authorized to access.

Initially, SAP admitted that TomorrowNow had accessed Oracle's software and support documentation using customers' credentials, but claimed they were entitled to do so as TomorrowNow had been contracted by those customers to provide third-party support for their Oracle products. Later, Oracle and SAP agreed to limit the scope of the trial to solely the copyright infringement claim and the damages. SAP offered to admit that TomorrowNow had indeed infringed Oracle's copyrights, leaving the jury court to only determine the amount of damages.

On the issue of damages, the two parties presented calculations that were vastly different. SAP claimed that Oracle had not suffered any losses and SAP/TomorrowNow had gained no financial benefit (rather they had lost $90 million) from the infringement. According to SAP's calculation, the damages were between $28 million and $408.7 million. Oracle based their damages calculation on the hypothetical price it would have cost a customer to purchase all the software and support in order to legally access all the material downloaded by TomorrowNow, totaling $2 billion.

== Court ruling ==
On November 23, 2010, the jury awarded Oracle damages in the amount of $1.3 billion. This was the highest amount of damages ever awarded in a copyright infringement case. On July 13, 2011, SAP motioned for seeking judgment as a matter of law that actual damages should not be based on hypothetical licenses, and for a new trial for the amount of damages. On September 1, 2011, U.S. District Judge Phyllis Hamilton granted the judgment as a matter of law on the hypothetical license damages, and vacated the $1.3 billion award amount. In her ruling Judge Hamilton stated:

Oracle's suggestion – that upon proof of infringement, copyright plaintiffs are automatically entitled to seek "hypothetical" license damages because they are presumed to have suffered harm in the form of lost license fees – has no support in the law."

SAP's motion for a new trial was granted, conditioned on Oracle rejecting a remittitur of $272 million, the "maximum amount of lost profits and infringer's profits sustainable by the proof."

Judge Hamilton further stated:

Determining a hypothetical license price requires an "objective, not a subjective" analysis, and "[e]xcessively speculative" claims must be rejected."

=== Hypothetical licenses ===
In 17 U.S.C. § 504 of the Copyright Act, it states that "the copyright owner is entitled to recover the actual damages suffered by him or her as a result of the infringement". Since the actual damages must be the result of the infringement, the burden is on the copyright holder to prove the connection between the monetary amount and the infringement.

Oracle was required to prove that the two parties would have agreed on the hypothetical license and license fees, but Oracle had no such evidence. Oracle did not provide facts on previous licensing history or practices. Oracle also failed to provide evidence on benchmark licenses, such as negotiated licenses for comparable works. There was no evidence that Oracle would have licensed to SAP or if the two parties would have ever agreed to any license, so the hypothetical lost license fees could not be the award damages. Hypothetical lost license fees can be used to calculate actual damages, but they do not imply automatic entitlement of damages. Actual proof is required for objective, non-speculative lost license price.

=== Remittitur amount ===
During the jury trial, Paul Meyer, Oracle's damages expert, provided analysis that the hypothetical lost license fees were in the range from $881 million to $2.69 billion, and thus the jury verdict was for $1.3 billion. However, the "verdict grossly exceeded the actual harm to Oracle in the form of lost customers," which was estimated by Mr. Meyer at either $408.7 million or $272 million, and estimated by SAP's damages expert at $28 million. The court rejected the $408.7 million figure from Mr. Meyer since it included "ongoing impact" through 2015, and that was not supported by the facts, since SAP ceased TomorrowNow's operations in 2008. The court also rejected the $28 million figure from SAP's expert, because it was based on inadmissible evidence. Therefore, the court set the remittitur at $272 million.

== See also ==
- Google LLC v. Oracle America, Inc.
