= SAP NetWeaver Identity Management =

SAP NetWeaver Identity Management is the Identity Management software suite SAP SE acquired in 2007 from MaXware. The latest release of the software is version 8.0, with Service Pack SP08 having been released in November, 2020.

SAP NetWeaver Identity Management is a tool used to manage the full identity life cycle of users - from joining an organization to moving across positions inside the organization. It manages user access, provides user access according to current business roles, and manages passwords with self-service capabilities and approval workflows. Also, when a user is leaving an organization, it automatically deprovisions user access rights. Normally, life cycle changes come through integration with SAP Human Capital Management or SAP SuccessFactors.

SAP Identity Management integrates with SAP Access Control to check for compliance issues, risk analysis, and risk mitigation connected with role assignments, as well as possible segregation-of-duties conflicts.

Maintenance for SAP Identity Management (SAP IDM), SAP's on-premises tool for managing the identity lifecycle, will end in 2027. Extended maintenance will be available until 2030.
