= Bob Miner =

American businessman (1941–1994)

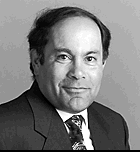
- Miner in 1992
- Born: Robert Nimrod Miner; December 23, 1941; Cicero, Illinois, U.S.
- Died: November 11, 1994 (aged 52); San Francisco, California, U.S.
- Education: University of Illinois at Urbana-Champaign (BS)
- Occupation: Co-founder of Oracle Corporation
- Years active: 1963–1994
- Spouse: Mary Miner
- Children: 3

Robert Nimrod Miner (December 23, 1941 – November 11, 1994) was an American businessman. He was the co-founder of Oracle Corporation and the producer of Oracle's relational database management system.

From 1977 until 1992, Miner led product design and development for the Oracle relational database management system. In December 1992, he left that role and spun off a small, advanced technology group within Oracle. He was an Oracle board member until October 1993.

== Early life ==
Bob Miner was born on December 23, 1941 in Cicero, Illinois, to an Iranian Assyrian family. Both of his parents came from Ada, a village in West Azerbaijan Province, northwest Iran, and had migrated to the US in the 1920s. He was their fifth child of five. Miner graduated in 1963 with a degree in mathematics from the University of Illinois at Urbana-Champaign.

== Career ==
In 1977, Miner met Larry Ellison at Ampex, where he was Larry's supervisor. Miner left Ampex soon thereafter to found a company called Software Development Laboratories with Ed Oates and Bruce Scott, with Larry Ellison joining the company several months later. It was at this time that Ed Oates introduced Miner and Ellison to a paper by E. F. Codd on the relational model for database management. IBM was slow to see the commercial value of Codd's relational database management system (RDBMS), allowing Miner and Ellison to beat them to the market.

In the start-up days of Oracle Bob Miner was the lead engineer, programming the majority of Oracle Version 3 by himself. As head of engineering, Miner's management style was in stark contrast to Larry Ellison, who cultivated Oracle's hard-driving sales culture. Although he expected his engineers to produce, he did not agree with the demands laid upon them by Ellison. He thought it was wrong for people to work extremely late hours and that they should have the chance to see their families. According to Ellison, Miner was "loyal to the people before the company".

== Personal life ==
Miner was diagnosed in 1993 with pleural mesothelioma, a rare form of lung cancer typically caused by exposure to asbestos. He died on November 11, 1994, at age 52, surrounded by his wife Mary and their three children, Nicola, Justine, and Luke. His wife Mary is the founder and owner of Oakville Ranch Vineyards, a Napa winery. His daughter Nicola Miner is married to author Robert Mailer Anderson.

Miner family's charitable foundation has donated to various San Francisco arts and education institutions. The SFJAZZ Center's auditorium is named after Miner. Family also donated $17 million to Roosevelt University in 2017.
