= Oracle Clinical =

Clinical data management software by Oracle

- Developer: Oracle Corporation
- Initial release: 1996
- Operating system: Microsoft Windows (client), Oracle Linux (server)
- Platform: Oracle Database, Oracle Fusion Middleware
- Type: Clinical data management system
- License: Proprietary commercial software
- Website: Official website

Oracle Clinical (OC) is a clinical data management system developed by Oracle Corporation for the design of clinical studies, definition of metadata and case report forms (CRFs), data entry and validation, medical coding, and laboratory data management in support of clinical trial operations. It is commonly deployed with Oracle's web-based Remote Data Capture (RDC Onsite) for site investigators to enter and review patient data online.

== Major functions ==
OC comprises the following functions:

- Study and case report form (CRF) design and metadata definition
- Central or site-based data entry with edit checks, derivations, and discrepancy management
- Batch loading and standardized extracts for analysis and reporting
- Medical thesaurus management for coding adverse events, medical history, and medications
- Laboratory data management with demographic-aware reference ranges and result flagging

== History ==
- Mid-1990s: Oracle Clinical is introduced as part of Oracle’s life-sciences applications portfolio (first documentation references appear in 1996).
- Adoption in large sponsors (late 1990s–2000s): Deployment at major companies; for example, Boehringer Ingelheim reported selecting Oracle Clinical/RDC as its EDC to integrate with existing clinical databases and scale to most trials.
- RDC Classic → RDC Onsite (2000s): A web-based interface (RDC Onsite) supersedes the legacy client, enabling browser-based site entry and monitoring documented by sponsors and public research networks.
- Acquisition era (2009–2012): Oracle expands the health-sciences portfolio with acquisitions of Relsys (Argus Safety, 2009), Phase Forward (2010), and ClearTrial (2012), shaping the broader eClinical suite around OC/RDC.
- Cloud transition (2020s): Oracle introduces Clinical One Data Collection as a cloud-native path for trial data capture, positioned alongside or as a successor for on-premises OC/RDC deployments.

== Adoption and competitors ==
OC/RDC are used in academic and government networks, as well as in corporate environments. Other products in the same or adjacent space include Medidata Rave, REDCap, and Veeva Vault EDC.

== See also ==
- Electronic data capture
- Clinical trial management system
