= Jeff Henley =

American businessman

- Born: 1945 (age 80–81)
- Education: University of California, Santa Barbara (BA); University of California, Los Angeles (MBA)
- Occupation: Businessman
- Title: Vice Chairman, Oracle Corporation

Jeffrey O. Henley (born 1945) is an American billionaire businessman, who is the vice chairman of Oracle Corporation, having previously been chairman.

== Early life ==
Henley graduated with a bachelor's degree in economics from the University of California, Santa Barbara (UCSB) in 1966. He received an MBA in finance from the UCLA Anderson School of Management in 1967.

He and his wife Judy Henley established the Jeff Henley Endowed Chair in Economics at UCSB.

Henley is a member of the Cal Gamma chapter of Sigma Phi Epsilon.

== Career ==
Prior to joining Oracle in 1991, Henley was executive vice president and chief financial officer at Pacific Holding Company, and as executive vice president and chief financial officer at Saga Corporation. He also was director of finance at Memorex Corporation, and as controller of international operations at Fairchild Semiconductor.

After Oracle experienced serious accounting issues, Henley and Raymond J. Lane brought what a rival described as "professional management and responsible people of integrity" to the company, and what Oracle's Jerry Held described as "bring in the adults". He was chairman of Oracle from January 2004 to September 2014, prior to which he was the chief financial officer and an executive vice president for 13 years from March 1991 to July 2004. He is also a member of the company's board of directors. Henley was appointed vice chairman in September 2014.

As of September 2025, Henley's net worth is estimated at $1.1 billion.
