= Judgment notwithstanding verdict =

Type of judgment as a matter of law

In the United States, judgment notwithstanding the verdict, also called judgment non obstante veredicto or JNOV, is a type of judgment as a matter of law that is sometimes rendered at the conclusion of a jury trial. In American state courts, JNOV is the practice whereby the presiding judge in a civil jury trial may overrule the decision of a jury and reverse or amend their verdict. In literal terms, the judge enters a judgment notwithstanding the jury verdict. The rarely granted intervention permits the judge to exercise discretion to avoid extreme and unreasonable jury decisions. In civil cases in U.S. federal court, the term was replaced in 1991 by the renewed judgment as a matter of law, which emphasizes its relationship to the judgment as a matter of law, formerly called a directed verdict.

A judge may not enter a JNOV of "guilty" following a jury acquittal in United States criminal cases. Such an action would violate a defendant's Fifth Amendment right not to be placed in double jeopardy and Sixth Amendment right to a trial by jury. The judge is permitted to grant a motion to set aside judgment after the jury convicts; however, the action may be reversed on appeal by the prosecution. This can only be appealed after a guilty verdict; a judgment cannot be appealed if made after the prosecution rests, but before the defense begins, rather than after a verdict. In U.S. federal criminal cases, the term is "judgment of acquittal".

A JNOV is appropriate only if the judge determines that no reasonable jury could have reached the given verdict as a matter of law. For example, if a party enters no evidence on an essential element of their case but the jury, the finder of fact, still finds in their favor, the court may rule that no reasonable jury would have disregarded the lack of evidence on that key point and reform the judgment. Even if a judge erroneously excludes evidence and acquits on the basis of insufficient evidence, a judgement of acquittal cannot be appealed, as ruled by the Supreme Court in Sanabria v. United States (1978).

The reversal of a jury's verdict by a judge occurs when the judge believes that there were insufficient facts on which to base the jury's verdict or that the verdict did not correctly apply the law. That procedure is similar to a situation in which a judge orders a jury to arrive at a particular verdict, called a directed verdict. A judgment notwithstanding the verdict is occasionally made when a jury refuses to follow a judge's instruction to arrive at a certain verdict.

== See also ==
- Judicial override
- Jury nullification
