= Oracle Corporation =

American multinational computer corporation

- Logo used since 2019

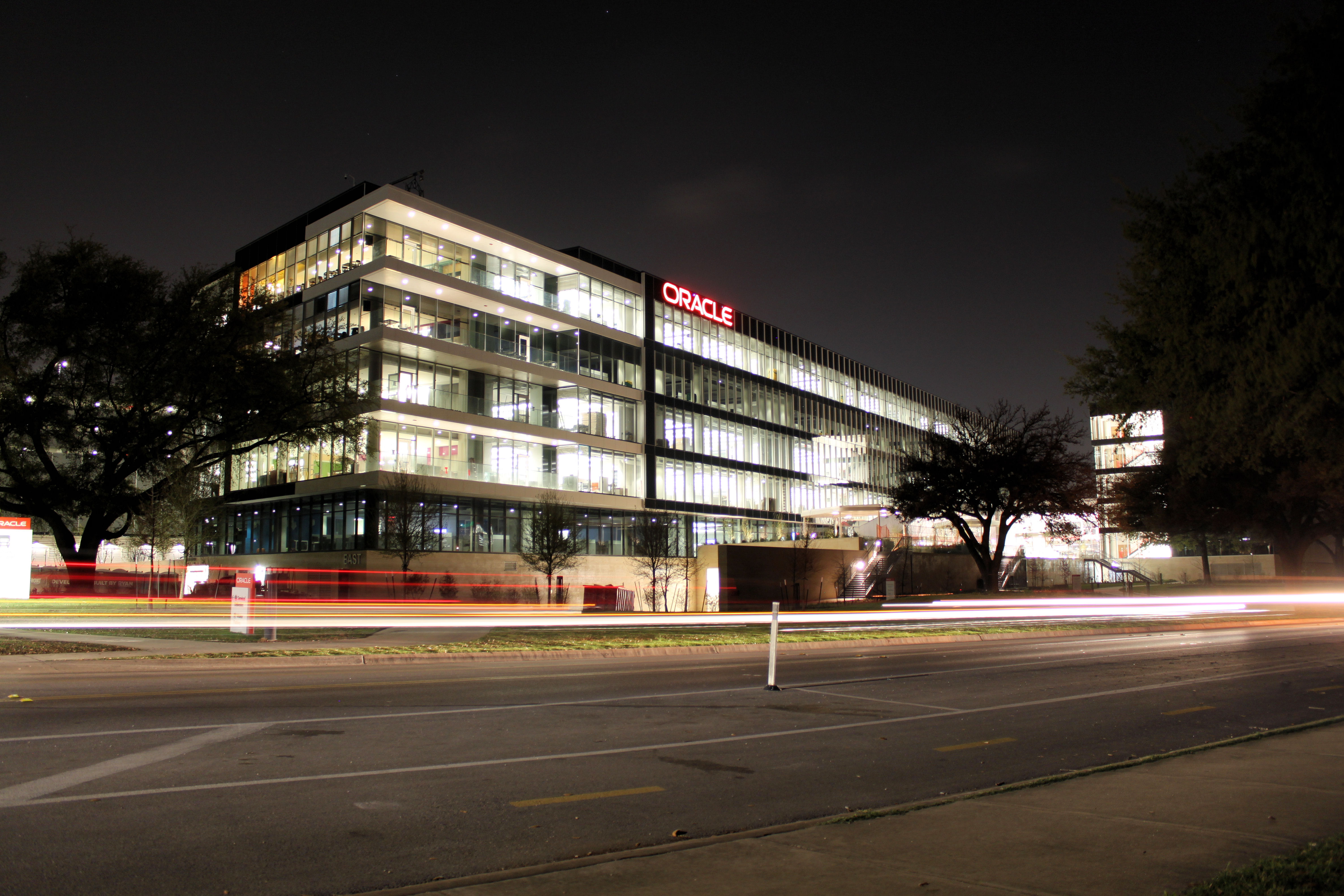
- Current headquarters in East Riverside, Austin, Texas, pictured in 2018
- Formerly: Software Development Laboratories (1977–1979); Relational Software, Inc. (1979–1983); Oracle Systems Corporation (1983–1995)
- Type: Public
- Traded as: NYSE: ORCL; S&P 100 component; S&P 500 component
- ISIN: US68389X1054
- Industry: Information technology
- Founded: June 16, 1977; 49 years ago, in Santa Clara, California, United States
- Founders: Larry Ellison; Bob Miner; Ed Oates
- Headquarters: Austin, Texas, United States; 30°14′34″N 97°43′18″W
- Area served: Worldwide
- Key people: Larry Ellison (executive chairman & CTO); Safra Catz (executive vice chair); Clay Magouyrk and Mike Sicilia (co-CEOs)
- Products: Enterprise software; Cloud computing; Computer hardware
- Brands: Java; MySQL; NetSuite; PeopleSoft; Siebel; Solaris; VirtualBox; Cerner; Full list
- Services: Software as a service; Infrastructure as a service; Consulting; Managed services
- Revenue: ▲US$67.36 billion (2026)
- Operating income: ▲US$20.61 billion (2026)
- Net income: ▲US$17.09 billion (2026)
- Total assets: ▲US$261.76 billion (2026)
- Total equity: ▲US$43.06 billion (2026)
- Owner: Larry Ellison (42.4%)
- Number of employees: c. 141,000 (June 23, 2026)
- Subsidiaries: List of Oracle subsidiaries
- Website: oracle.com
- Footnotes; Financials as of May 31, 2025.

Oracle Corporation is an American multinational technology company headquartered in Austin, Texas. Co-founded in Santa Clara, California, in 1977 by Bob Miner, Ed Oates, and current chairman of the board and chief technology officer Larry Ellison, Oracle is among the 50 largest companies in the world by market cap, and ranked 52nd on the Forbes Global 2000 as of 2026.

The company sells database software (particularly the Oracle Database), enterprise applications, and cloud infrastructure and hardware. Oracle's core application software is a suite of enterprise software products, including enterprise resource planning (ERP), human capital management (HCM), customer experience (CX) and supply chain management (SCM) software.

== History ==
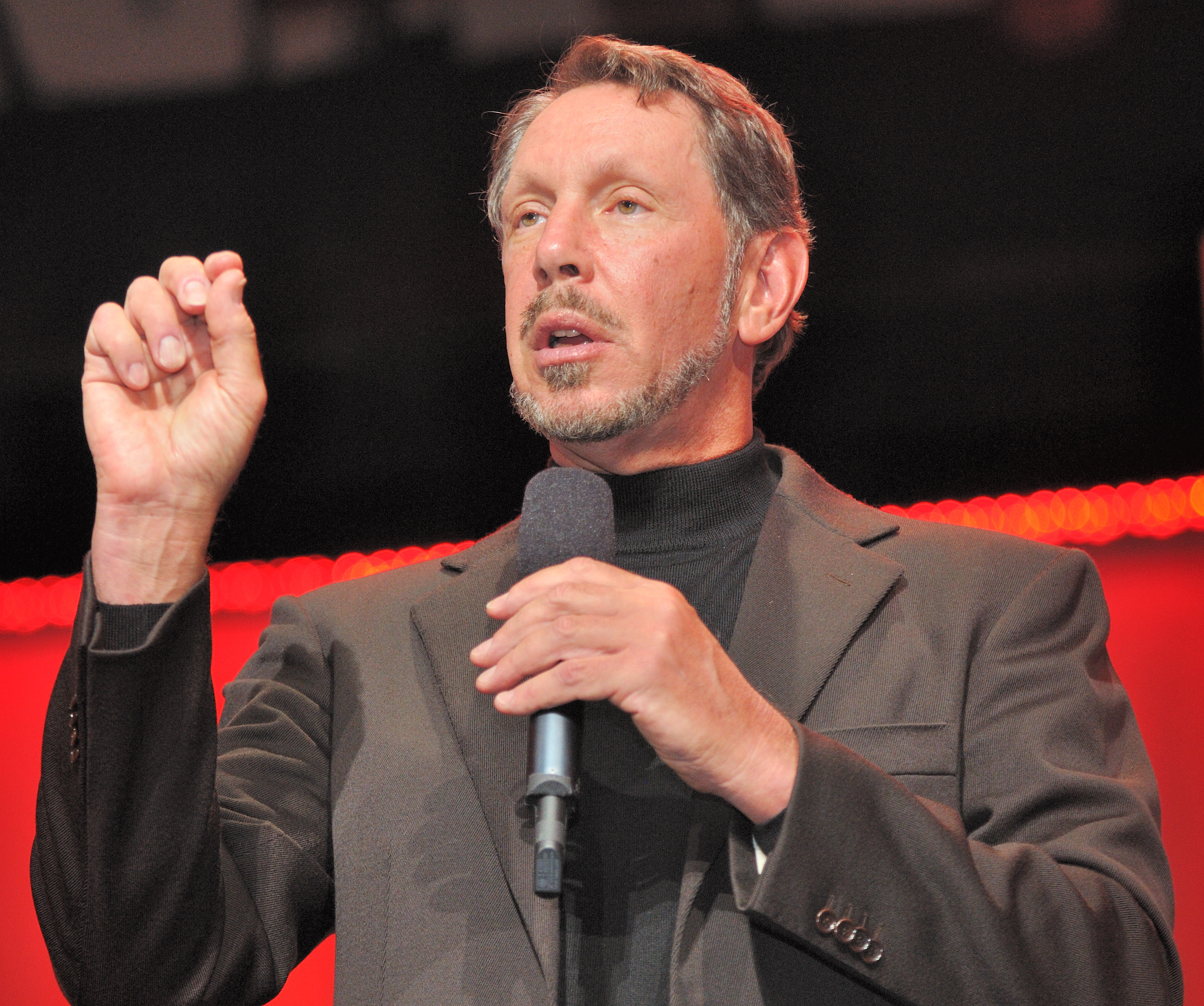
Larry Ellison, executive chairman and co-founder of Oracle

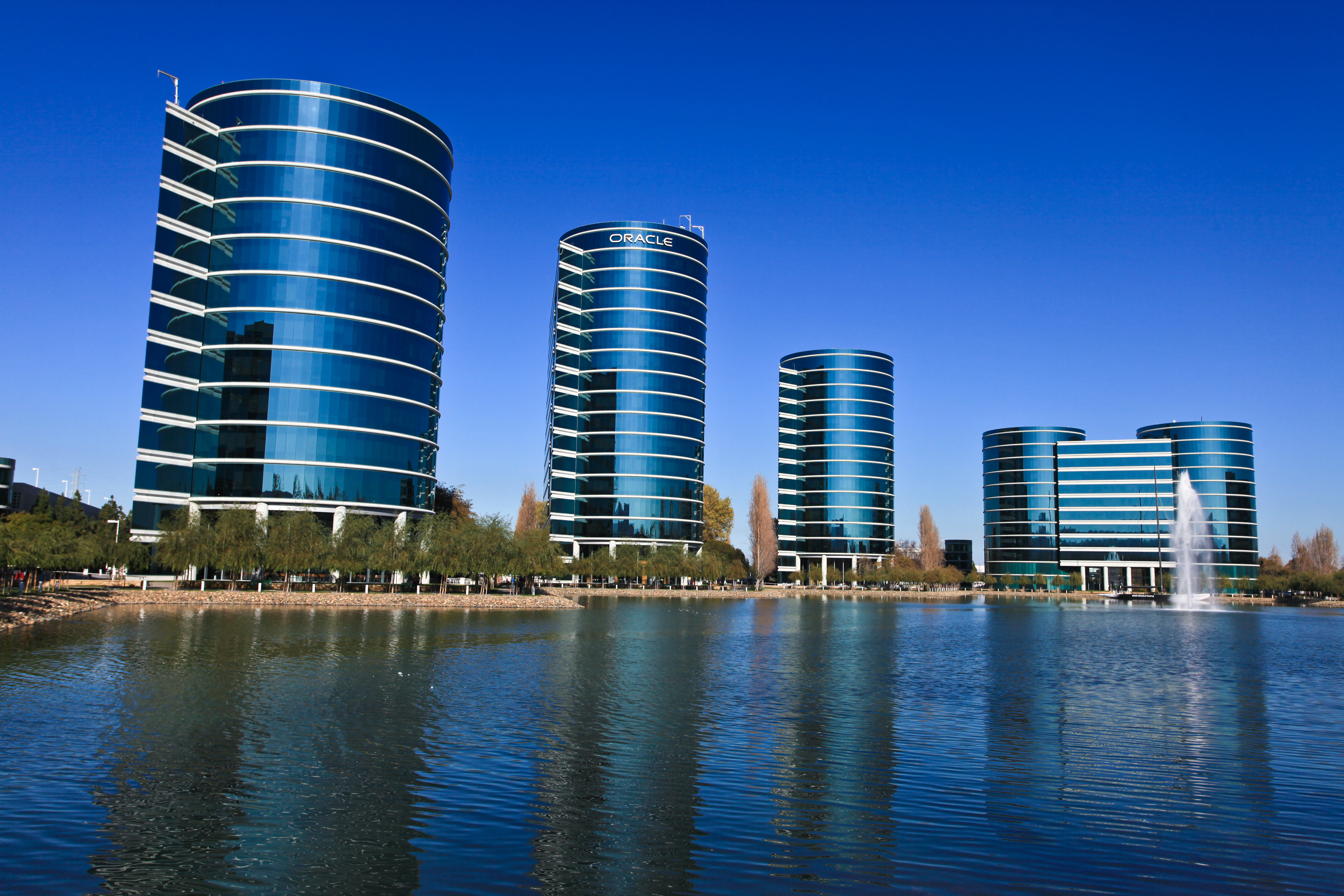
Oracle Corporation's former headquarters in Redwood Shores, California

Larry Ellison, Bob Miner, and Ed Oates co-founded Oracle on June 16, 1977, in Santa Clara, California, as Software Development Laboratories (SDL). Beginning as consultants with a background in large-scale memory after a project for Ampex, Ellison took inspiration from the 1970 paper written by Edgar F. Codd on relational database management systems (RDBMS) named "A Relational Model of Data for Large Shared Data Banks". He heard about the IBM System R database from an article in an IBM research journal provided by Oates. Ellison wanted to make Oracle's product compatible with System R, but failed to do so as IBM kept the error codes for its DBMS a secret. SDL changed its name to Relational Software, Inc (RSI) in 1979, then again to Oracle Systems Corporation in 1983, to align itself more closely with its flagship product Oracle Database. The name also drew from the codename of a 1977 project for the Central Intelligence Agency, Oracle's first customer; the company received permission to use the code name for the new product. (According to Oracle executive Mike Humphries, Miner told him that the new company had the choice of the CIA database project or another offer to develop a compiler for the PDP-4, and the founders flipped a coin to decide.)

Miner served as a senior programmer, and Oates also worked in development. The three founders decided that Ellison was the worst programmer so he became the salesman. Understanding both customers and technology, Ellison designed database tables that he used to demonstrate the power of SQL to customers. By February 1983 the Rosen Electronics Letter said that Oracle was "the most comprehensive offering we've seen" among databases, with good marketing and a substantial installed base encouraging developers to write software for it. The newsletter said that revenue in fiscal 1983 would be about $8 million and would double in 1984. On March 12, 1986, the company had its initial public offering. In 1989, Oracle moved its world headquarters to the Redwood Shores neighborhood of Redwood City, California, though its campus was not completed until 1995. The company hired so many from top universities that Humphries compared it to "Cargill buying crops". Some new employees worked as receptionists or distributed coffee until more suitable positions became available.

Oracle in the late 1980s began selling enterprise software running on the database, starting with financial software, then manufacturing. Many at Oracle wanted to discontinue applications; the first several versions were weak, they competed with the company's independent software vendors and value-added reseller partners, and applications were never profitable for Oracle until after 2000. Selling them (and acquiring vendors such as JD Edwards and PeopleSoft, the latter being the second hostile takeover in the history of software) nonetheless allowed Oracle to compete with SAP; by the mid-2000s it was the world's largest enterprise software vendor. The company's Ken Jacobs later said:

It created a strategic footprint in our customers. It gave us a whole stack, a credible stack. And we could now sell at a higher point into the companies, into the board room. And, our large customers wanted to consider us a strategic partner, rather than just a vendor of technology. So, it has, actually, had a big impact on the way our sales force could sell.

In 1995, Oracle Systems Corporation changed its name to Oracle Corporation, officially named Oracle, but is sometimes referred to as Oracle Corporation, the name of the holding company.

In 2010, Oracle launched Fusion Applications to unify the features and technologies of acquisitions PeopleSoft, Siebel Systems, and JD Edwards, into a single suite.

On July 15, 2013, Oracle transferred its stock listing from Nasdaq to the New York Stock Exchange. At the time, it was the largest-ever U.S. market transfer.

In 2018, Oracle opened a new office in the neighboorhod of East Riverside in southeast Austin, Texas. In December 2020, Oracle announced that it was moving its world headquarters from Redwood Shores to Austin, Texas.

In an effort to compete with Amazon Web Services and its products, Oracle announced in 2019 it was partnering with former rival Microsoft. The alliance claimed that Oracle Cloud and Microsoft Azure would be directly connected, allowing customers of each to store data on both cloud computing platforms and run software on either Oracle or Azure. Some saw this not only as an attempt to compete with Amazon but also with Google and Salesforce, which acquired Looker and Tableau Software, respectively. In 2023, Oracle and Microsoft expanded their partnership to deliver Oracle database services on Oracle Cloud Infrastructure running inside Microsoft Azure.

A year later, Oracle announced similar partnerships with Amazon Web Services and Google Cloud, making the Oracle database available in all four major hyperscaler providers.

In December 2021, Oracle announced the acquisition of Cerner, a health information technology company. The acquisition of Cerner was completed on June 8, 2022, for US$28.3 billion in cash. Also in December 2021, Oracle announced the acquisition of Federos, an artificial intelligence (AI) and automation tools company for network performance.

In February 2023, the company announced it was going to invest $1.5 billion into the Kingdom of Saudi Arabia, including opening a data center in the country's capital, Riyadh.

In April 2024, Oracle announced it was moving its world headquarters from Austin to a new complex in Nashville, Tennessee. No timeframe was given.

In June 2024, Oracle announced a $1 billion investment in Spain to enhance artificial intelligence and cloud computing. This investment will create a new cloud region in Madrid in partnership with Telefónica. The goal is to help Spanish businesses and the public sector with digital transformation and to meet European Union regulations. The same year, the company announced investments in Japan and Malaysia for US$8 billion and US$6.5 billion, respectively.

In January 2025, President Donald Trump announced Stargate, a joint venture by Oracle, OpenAI, SoftBank and investment firm MGX to invest $500 billion over four years in artificial intelligence infrastructure in the US. Also in 2025, the company announced additional investments in the United Kingdom, Germany and the Netherlands for US$5 billion and US$3 billion, respectively.

In September 2025, Oracle announced it was promoting Clay Magouyrk, president of cloud infrastructure, and Mike Sicilia, president of industries, to become co-CEOs. They replaced Safra Catz, who held the position for 11 years, and transitioned to a new role as executive vice chair.

In January 2026, social media platform TikTok announced it finalized a deal to change ownership of its U.S. operations, with Oracle, MGX and private equity firm Silver Lake each owning a 15% stake in the venture, while ByteDance retained a 19.9% stake. As of March 2026, Oracle's TikTok stake was worth an estimated ~$2B.

In March 2026, Oracle signed a voluntary "ratepayer protection pledge" where companies pledge to build or buy energy needed to power data centers at a different rate to regular consumers, allowing them to keep utility bills down substantially.

In April 2026, it was reported that Oracle laid off nearly 12,000 staff in India, according to the impacted employees. The company was believed to be planning another mass layoff round within a month.

In May 2026, Oracle reported that it employed 141,000 full-time workers, down from 162,000 a year earlier, according to its annual regulatory filing. The decline represented a reduction of approximately 21,000 employees, or nearly 13% of its workforce, amid broader layoffs across the technology sector as companies increased investments in artificial intelligence.

For the second quarter of fiscal year 2026 (ending November 2025), Oracle reported total revenue of $14.1 billion, with cloud infrastructure (IaaS) revenue growing 68% year-over-year to $4.1 billion. Total remaining performance obligations surged to $130 billion, reflecting strong demand for AI infrastructure capacity.

== Products and services ==
Oracle provides cloud infrastructure, AI services, database and database management software, enterprise applications, analytics, and developer tools that help businesses manage their data, operations, and IT environments.

=== Software applications ===
Oracle provides software applications, such as integrated enterprise software applications, Oracle Fusion Cloud Applications, human capital management (HCM), customer relationship management (CRM), and supply chain management (SCM).

=== Databases ===
The Oracle Database was released in 2004 as 10g. Subsequently, the product was released several times, with the newest issue released as 12c in 2018. Oracle released its Autonomous Database in 2018, Oracle Database 23ai in 2024, and issued its newest release Oracle AI Database 26ai in 2025.

Additionally, Oracle Corporation acquired and developed the following additional database technologies:

- Berkeley DB, which offers embedded database processing
- Oracle Rdb, a relational database system running on OpenVMS platforms. Oracle acquired Rdb in 1994 from Digital Equipment Corporation. Oracle has since made many enhancements to this product and development continues as of 2008.
- TimesTen, which features in-memory database operations
- Oracle Essbase, which continues the Hyperion Essbase tradition of multi-dimensional database management
- MySQL, a relational database management system licensed under the GNU General Public License, initially developed by MySQL AB
- Oracle NoSQL Database, a scalable, distributed key-value NoSQL database

=== Data centers ===
In March 2026, Oracle announced plans to build 72 multicloud data centers embedded with Microsoft, Amazon, and Google clouds. At the same time, Oracle had more than 200 live or in-progress cloud regions throughout the world—more than any of its competitors. The multicloud database side of the business grew 817% in Q2 of fiscal year 2026.

Oracle’s data center expansion has drawn opposition from some residents and environmental groups over concerns about water consumption, energy demand, air quality, and the effects of large-scale construction on surrounding communities. Such concerns have emerged around projects including the planned Project Jupiter campus in southern New Mexico, where critics have questioned the development’s water and power requirements and its potential effects on local resources.

Oracle and its development partners have announced measures intended to reduce the environmental impact of new data centers. The planned Port Washington, Wisconsin, campus is expected to use closed-loop liquid cooling, match non-renewable energy consumption with renewable-energy purchases, and pursue LEED certification. Project Jupiter’s developers replaced plans for gas turbines and diesel generators with solid oxide fuel cells and have said the campus will use recycled, non-potable water to reduce freshwater consumption.

=== Middleware ===
Oracle Fusion Middleware is a family of middleware software products, including application server, system integration, business process management (BPM), user interaction, content management, identity management and business intelligence (BI) products.

==== Oracle Secure Enterprise Search ====
Oracle Secure Enterprise Search (SES), Oracle's enterprise-search offering, gives users the ability to search for content across multiple locations, including websites, XML files, file servers, content management systems, enterprise resource planning systems, customer relationship management systems, business intelligence systems, and databases.

=== Product Lines ===
Oracle Applications, software sold by Oracle based on its own database, first appeared in the late 1980s. Oracle Corporation maintains a number of product lines, such as:

- Oracle E-Business Suite
- PeopleSoft Enterprise
  - PeopleSoft EnterpriseOne (Later renamed, JD Edwards EnterpriseOne)
  - PeopleSoft World (Later renamed, JD Edwards World)
- Siebel
- JD Edwards
- Merchandise Operations Management (Formerly Retek)
- Planning & Optimisation
- Store Operations (Formerly 360Commerce)

=== Enterprise management ===
Oracle Enterprise Manager (OEM) is a web-based monitoring and management tool for Oracle products (and for some third-party software), including database management, middleware management, application management, hardware and virtualization management and cloud management.

The Primavera products of Oracle's Construction & Engineering Global Business Unit (CEGBU) consist of project-management software.

=== Development software ===
Oracle Corporation's tools for developing applications include (among others):

- Oracle Designer – a CASE tool which integrates with Oracle Developer Suite
- Oracle Developer – which consists of Oracle Forms, Oracle Discoverer and Oracle Reports
- Oracle JDeveloper, a freeware IDE
- NetBeans, a Java-based software-development platform
- Oracle APEX – low-code platform for web-oriented development
- Oracle SQL Developer, an integrated development environment for working with SQL-based databases
- Oracle SQL*Plus Worksheet, a component of Oracle Enterprise Manager (OEM)
- OEPE, Oracle Enterprise Pack for Eclipse
- Open Java Development Kit
- Oracle Developer Studio – a software generation system for the development of C, C++, Fortran, and Java software
- Oracle Visual Builder Studio

=== Operating systems ===
Oracle Corporation develops and supports two operating systems: Oracle Solaris and Oracle Linux.

=== Hardware ===
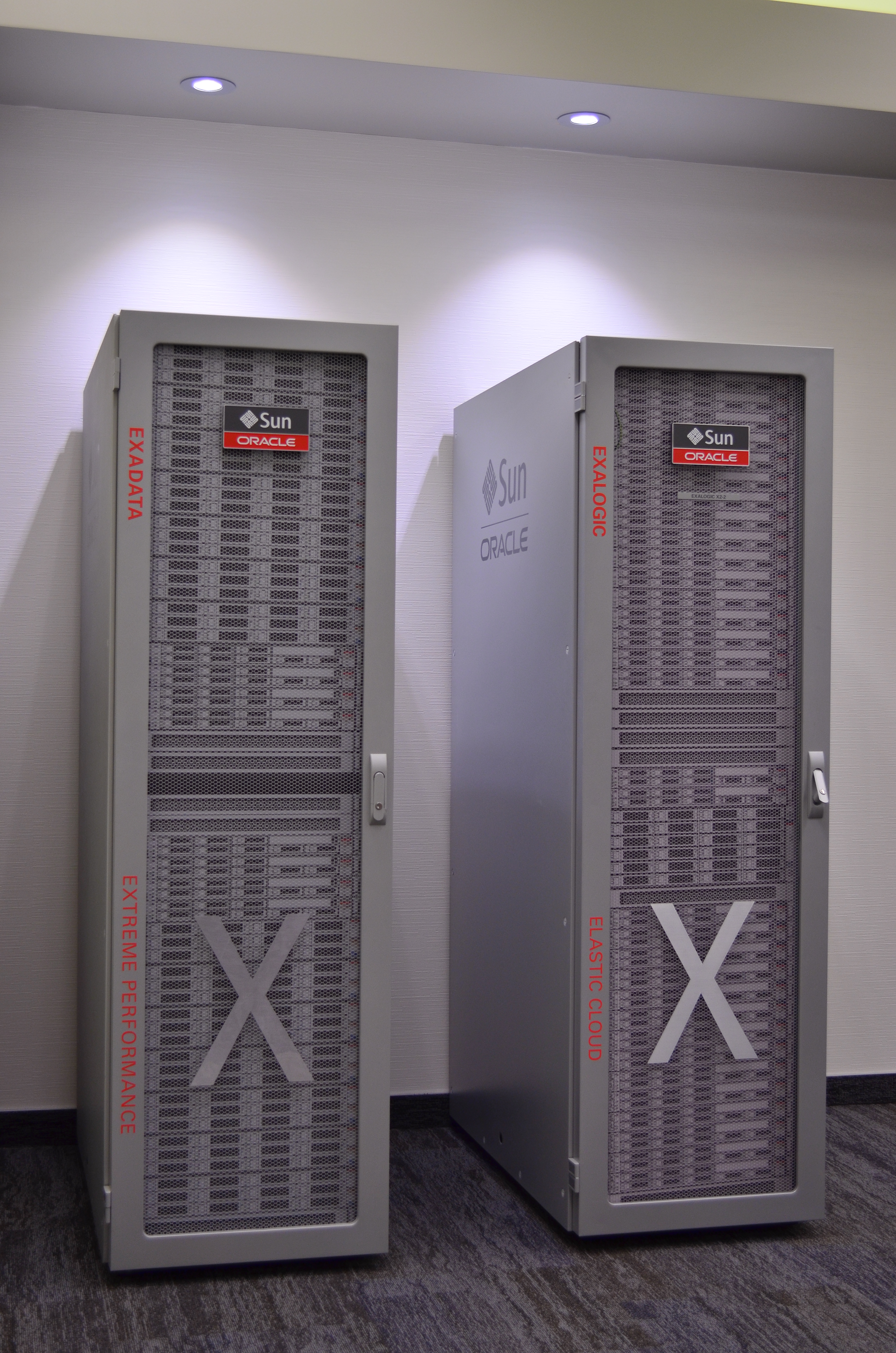
Oracle Exadata and Exalogic

- The Sun hardware range acquired by Oracle Corporation's purchase of Sun Microsystems
- Oracle SPARC T-series servers and M-series mainframes developed and released after Sun acquisition
- Engineered systems: pre-engineered and pre-assembled hardware/software bundles for enterprise use
  - Exadata Database Machine – hardware/software integrated storage
  - Exalogic Elastic Cloud – hardware/software integrated application server
  - Exalytics In-Memory Machine – hardware/software integrated in-memory analytics server
  - Oracle Database Appliance
  - Big Data Appliance – integrated map-reduce/big data solution
  - SPARC SuperCluster T4-4 – a general purpose engineered system

=== Services ===
==== Oracle Cloud ====
Oracle Cloud is a cloud computing service offered by Oracle Corporation providing servers, storage, network, applications and services through a global network of Oracle Corporation managed data centers. The company allows these services to be provisioned on demand over the Internet.

Oracle Cloud provides Infrastructure as a Service (IaaS), Platform as a Service (PaaS), Software as a Service (SaaS) and Data as a Service (DaaS). These services are used to build, deploy, integrate and extend applications in the cloud.

Oracle has continued to make updates to its generative AI service, which is built and supported on Oracle Cloud Infrastructure and large language models (LLM) from Cohere as of 2023, Meta's Llama as of 2024, and xAI's Grok 3 as of 2025. The company has also been working to integrate generative AI into its other services. In April 2025, Oracle incorporated HeatWave GenAI into its database. In September 2025, Oracle and OpenAI signed a $300 billion contract for 4.5 gigawatts of power capacity over five years. In October 2025, Oracle and Microsoft announced a partnership to enhance supply chain efficiency and responsiveness for manufacturers. It was also announced that Oracle will offer cloud services using Advanced Micro Devices' upcoming MI450 artificial intelligence chips.

===== OPERA Cloud =====
OPERA Cloud is a property management software (PMS) positioned under Oracle Hospitality. It's available across 236 countries and territories. In 2026, IHG Hotels & Resorts onboarded OPERA Cloud as its official PMS. In 2025, Accor onboarded it as its official PMS, moving away from Mews (software). In 2023, it was a market leader among PMSs.

== Marketing ==
=== Sales practices ===
In 1990, Oracle laid off 10% (about 400 people) of its work force because of accounting errors. This crisis came about because of Oracle's "up-front" marketing strategy, in which sales people urged potential customers to buy the largest possible amount of software all at once. The sales people then booked the value of future license sales in the current quarter, thereby increasing their bonuses. This became a problem when the future sales subsequently failed to materialize. Oracle eventually had to restate its earnings twice, and also settled (out of court) class-action lawsuits arising from its having overstated its earnings. Ellison stated in 1992 that Oracle had made "an incredible business mistake".

Humphries described the cause ("building for years") as a combination of technical problems that benefited rivals, and the sales force using side letters and other improper tactics to meet the company's longstanding goal of doubling revenue each year. Ellison hired ("bring in adults", Jerry Held said) new executives Jeff Henley and Raymond J. Lane, who helped the company recover from what Ken Jacobs later described as a "near death experience", in which Oracle required an investment from a Japanese steel company to meet payroll.

=== Competition ===
The relational database industry was unusually concentrated. Besides being headquartered near each other in the San Francisco Bay area, database technology experts attended the same universities and served on the same standards committees (with Jim Gray serving as neutral arbiter as companies tried to get competing proposals enacted). Sales and marketing people were both fierce rivals and often moved between the companies, even as engineers socialized with each other. The smaller, later-founded database vendors viewed Oracle as their top enemy, with Bob MacDonald of Informix Software calling Oracle "the evil empire", while Humphries described his company as "the Klingons of" the bay.

Held later described his company's philosophy as "it's not good enough for Oracle to win. It was important for somebody else to lose". Ingres was its first major competitor; Oracle's strategy of focusing on one opponent at a time. Even publicly complimenting other rivals "to take the pressure off", Held said, while effective, caused it to neglect Sybase as a threat. Conversely, when Sybase had technical problems "it was: how do you put every ounce of product marketing, sales effort and focus on that". IBM's endorsement of SQL in Db2 in the early 1980s benefited Oracle and forced rivals like Ingres and Informix Corporation to adopt SQL to compete. Oracle acknowledged IBM as the standard while emphasizing its own superiority, touting "total IBM SQL compatibility" while IBM's software ran "only on IBM mainframes". By the mid-1980s the company described its database as "the last DBMS", bragging that Oracle now had larger database revenue than dBASE maker Ashton-Tate, and stating that Microsoft, Ashton-Tate, and Sybase's planned Microsoft SQL Server "jumped on Oracle's SQL bandwagon".

MacDonald credited Oracle with "being marketing oriented before any of the competitors ... pushing the envelope on selling the future way ahead of the rest of us". Stu Schuster of Sybase said "Larry taught us a lot about marketing". While other database companies' brochures emphasized technical features, Oracle advertisements showed an Oracle jet fighter shooting down Ashton-Tate and Borland biplanes; dBASE, IBM, and Db2 were among the many competitors Oracle marketing criticized by name. Conversely, another Oracle ad quoted Microsoft's Bill Gates, Sun's Scott McNealy, Hewlett-Packard's John A. Young, and Apple Computer's John Sculley as agreeing with Ellison on Oracle's database breakthroughs. Larry Rowe of Ingres said "you could never come up with a strategy to beat Oracle because whatever you said today, two days later Ellison was saying it with more marketing dollars". Jacobs said, by contrast:

It really surprises me when people say Oracle's a great marketing machine because by definition, if you think a company has great marketing, they don't. If you think they have great technology then they do have a great marketing machine. Larry's belief has fundamentally always been that marketing isn't critical; he's famous for saying, "If you're not building the product and you're not selling it, tell me what it is you do." Because those are the things that he felt were important. So marketing has never been a focus.

The "benchmark wars" began in the early 1980s; Roger Sippl of Informix said that when his company's product beat Oracle on 27 of 30 benchmarks, advertisements titled "Oracle wins again!" appeared citing the three it won, and Ellison allegedly called Dave DeWitt at the University of Wisconsin after he developed a benchmark unfavorable to Oracle, threatening to get the professor fired. Schuster and Held recalled "a not very pleasant environment because it was so directly competitive". They and Sippl described "a vicious cycle" of companies battling each other over, for example, whose distributed database had the best two-phase commit:

The ads weren't to let me show you how my product helps you solve your business problem, Mr. Customer. It's let me tell you how much better I am than the guy down the street to the point of taking out billboards.

Even IBM participated in the "billboard wars". By 1995 Oracle had 44% of the $2.4 billion relational database market; Sybase had 17% and Informix had 16%. By 1996 Informix, after acquiring Illustra, became Oracle's most important rival. The intense war between Informix CEO Phil White and Ellison made front-page news in Silicon Valley for three years. Informix claimed that Oracle had hired away Informix engineers to disclose important trade secrets about an upcoming product. Informix finally dropped its lawsuit against Oracle in 1997. Held said

And, in one year, we kind of turned the focus from Sybase to Informix, and basically they never knew what hit them. It was such a concerted effort. I mean, it was amazing how you could get product management, marketing, and sales focused. We had a thing, "Where in the world is Phil White," because Phil White was their best sales person. If he went into an account, one of our best guys was in right after them to make sure that they didn't win that business. It was such amazingly focused effort. And within 12 months, Informix was basically on the floor.

In November 2005, a book detailing the war between Oracle and Informix was published, titled The Real Story of Informix Software and Phil White. It gave a detailed chronology of the battle of Informix against Oracle, and how Informix Software's CEO Phil White landed in jail because of his obsession with overtaking Ellison.

After what Held described as "the period of time where some of the wheels came off, first at Ingres then at Sybase, and then at Informix", Oracle was the only substantial independent database vendor until Microsoft SQL Server became widespread in the late 1990s and IBM acquired Informix Software in 2001 (to complement its Db2 database). Oracle has competed for new database licenses on UNIX, GNU, and Windows operating systems primarily against IBM's Db2 and Microsoft SQL Server.

In 2004, Oracle's sales grew at a rate of 14.5% to $6.2 billion, giving it 41.3% and the top share of the relational-database market (InformationWeek – March 2005), with market share estimated at up to 44.6% in 2005 by some sources. Oracle Corporation's main competitors in the database arena remain IBM Db2 and Microsoft SQL Server, and to a lesser extent Sybase and Teradata, with free databases such as PostgreSQL and MySQL also having a significant share of the market. EnterpriseDB, based on PostgreSQL, has recently made inroads by proclaiming that its product delivers Oracle-compatible SQL and procedural language features at a much lower price-point.

Oracle's main competitors in the database market include IBM and Microsoft, and in enterprise applications, SAP. On March 22, 2007, Oracle sued SAP, accusing it of fraud and unfair competition.

In the market for business intelligence software, many other software companies, both small and large, have successfully competed in quality with Oracle and SAP products. Business intelligence vendors can be categorized into the "big four" consolidated BI firms such as Oracle, who has entered BI market through a recent trend of acquisitions (including Hyperion Solutions), and the independent "pure play" vendors such as MicroStrategy, Actuate, and SAS.

Oracle Financials was ranked in the Top 20 Most Popular Accounting Software Infographic by Capterra in 2014, beating out SAP and a number of its other competitors.

==== Oracle and SAP ====
From 1988, Oracle Corporation and the German company SAP AG had a decade-long history of cooperation, beginning with the integration of SAP's R/3 enterprise application suite with Oracle's relational database products. Despite the SAP partnership with Microsoft, and the increasing integration of SAP applications with Microsoft products (such as Microsoft SQL Server, a competitor to Oracle Database), Oracle and SAP continue their cooperation. According to Oracle Corporation, the majority of SAP's customers use Oracle databases.

In 2004, Oracle began to increase its interest in the enterprise-applications market (in 1989, Oracle had already released Oracle Financials). A series of acquisitions by Oracle Corporation began, most notably with those of PeopleSoft, Siebel Systems, and Hyperion.

SAP recognized that Oracle had started to become a competitor in a market where SAP had the leadership, and saw an opportunity to lure in customers from those companies that Oracle Corporation had acquired. SAP would offer those customers special discounts on the licenses for its enterprise applications.

Oracle Corporation would resort to a similar strategy, by advising SAP customers to get "OFF SAP" (a play on the words of the acronym for its middleware platform "Oracle Fusion for SAP"), and also by providing special discounts on licenses and services to SAP customers who chose Oracle Corporation products.

Oracle and SAP (the latter through its recently acquired subsidiary TomorrowNow) competed in the third-party enterprise software maintenance and support market. On March 22, 2007, Oracle filed a lawsuit against SAP. In Oracle Corporation v. SAP AG Oracle alleged that TomorrowNow, which provides discount support for legacy Oracle product lines, used the accounts of former Oracle customers to systematically download patches and support documents from Oracle's website and to appropriate them for SAP's use. Some analysts have suggested the suit could form part of a strategy by Oracle Corporation to decrease competition with SAP in the market for third-party enterprise software maintenance and support.

On July 3, 2007, SAP admitted that TomorrowNow employees had made "inappropriate downloads" from the Oracle support website. However, it claims that SAP personnel and SAP customers had no access to Oracle intellectual property via TomorrowNow. SAP's CEO Henning Kagermann stated that "Even a single inappropriate download is unacceptable from my perspective. We regret very much that this occurred." Additionally, SAP announced that it had "instituted changes" in TomorrowNow's operational oversight.

On November 23, 2010, a U.S. district court jury in Oakland, California, found that SAP AG must pay Oracle Corp $1.3 billion for copyright infringement, awarding damages that could be the largest-ever for copyright infringement. While admitting liability, SAP estimated the damages at no more than $40 million, while Oracle claimed that they are at least $1.65 billion. The awarded amount is one of the 10 or 20 largest jury verdicts in U.S. legal history. SAP said it was disappointed by the verdict and might appeal. On September 1, 2011, a federal judge overturned the judgment and offered a reduced amount or a new trial, calling Oracle's original award "grossly" excessive. Oracle chose a new trial.

On August 3, 2012, SAP and Oracle agreed on a judgment for $306 million in damages, pending approval from the U.S. district court judge, "to save time and expense of [a] new trial". After the accord has been approved, Oracle can ask a federal appeals court to reinstate the earlier jury verdict. In addition to the damages payment, SAP has already paid Oracle $120 million for its legal fees.

=== Slogans ===
- "Information driven"
- For the Oracle Database: "Can't break it, can't break in" and "Unbreakable"
- "Enabling the Information Age"
- "Enabling the Information Age Through Network Computing"
- As of 2008: "The Information Company"
- As of 2010: "Software. Hardware. Complete."
- As of late 2010: "Hardware and Software, Engineered to Work Together"
- As of mid 2015: "Integrated Cloud Applications and Platform Services"

== Corporate affairs ==
=== Finances ===
Sales by region (2025)
Region	share
United States	55.9%
United Kingdom	4.5%
Germany	3.2%
Japan	3.1%
Other countries	33.4%

Oracle was ranked No. 82 in the 2018 Fortune 500 list of the largest United States corporations by total revenue. According to Bloomberg, Oracle's CEO-to-employee pay ratio is 1,205:1. The CEO's compensation in 2017 was $108,295,023. Oracle is one of the approved employers of ACCA and the median employee compensation rate was $89,887.

Development since 2005
Year	Revenue in million US$	Net Income in million US$	EOY adj price per share in US$	Employees
2005	11,799	2,886	9.98	
2006	14,380	3,381	14.01	
2007	17,996	4,274	18.46	
2008	22,430	5,521	14.49	
2009	23,252	5,593	20.20	
2010	26,820	6,135	25.98	
2011	35,622	8,547	21.44	
2012	37,121	9,981	28.25	
2013	37,180	10,925	32.68	122,000
2014	38,275	10,955	38.88	122,000
2015	38,226	9,938	32.02	132,000
2016	37,047	8,901	34.23	136,000
2017	37,728	9,335	42.76	138,000
2018	39,831	3,825	41.33	137,000
2019	39,506	11,083	49.32	136,000
2020	39,068	10,135	61.26	135,000
2021	40,479	13,746	83.85	132,000
2022	42,440	6,717	79.95	143,000
2023	49,954	8,503	104.69	164,000
2024	52,961	10,467	165.26	159,000
2025	57,399	12,443		162,000

=== Personnel ===
- Larry Ellison: ex-executive chairman and CTO (since September 2014), co-founder of the company, previously CEO (1977–2014), previously chairman (1990–2004). As of September 2021, he owned 42% of the company. As of 2025 Ellison remains a top executive but no longer CEO.
- Safra Catz: executive vice chair (since September 2025), previously CEO (2014–2025), co-president (since 2004) and CFO. In 2016, she was ranked tenth on Fortune's Most Powerful Women list.
- Jeff Henley: vice chairman (since September 2014), previously chairman (2004–2014) and CFO (1991–2004).
- Mark Hurd: former CEO (2014–2019), previously co-president (2010–2014). In 2007, Mark Hurd was ranked No. 16 on Fortune's list of the 25 Most Powerful People in Business. He died in 2019.
- Charles Phillips: former co-president and director (2003–2010); replaced by Mark Hurd.
- Bob Miner: co-founder of the company and co-architect of Oracle Database. Led product design and development for Oracle Database (1977–1992). Spun off a technology group within Oracle in 1992. Oracle board member until 1993. He died in 1994.
- Ed Oates: co-founder of the company. Retired from Oracle in 1996.
- Umang Gupta: former vice president and general manager (1981–1984). Wrote the first business plan for the company. He died in 2022.
- Bruce Scott: The first hired employee (after the co-founders; employee number 4) at Oracle (then Software Development Laboratories). Scott served as the co-author and co-architect of the Oracle database up to Version 3. He left Oracle in 1982.
- Marc Benioff: former protégé of Ellison and the youngest to be promoted to vice president at the time. He left to found and lead Salesforce in 1999.

==== Board of directors ====
As of September 2025, the company's board consisted of the following directors:

- Larry Ellison, executive chairman and CTO
- Safra Catz, executive vice chair
- Jeff Henley, vice chairman
- Awo Ablo, President of Programs and Strategy
- Jeffrey S. Berg, chairman of Northside Services and former CEO of International Creative Management
- Michael Boskin, Professor of Economics and Hoover Institution Senior Fellow at Stanford University
- Bruce R. Chizen, Senior Adviser to Permira Advisers and Former CEO of Adobe
- George H. Conrades, former CEO of Akamai Technologies
- Rona Fairhead, Baroness Fairhead, former UK minister of state at the Department for International Trade
- Charles Wick Moorman IV, former CEO of Amtrak and the Norfolk Southern Railway
- Leon Panetta, former CIA director and United States Secretary of Defense
- William G. Parrett, former CEO of Deloitte Touche Tohmatsu
- Naomi O. Seligman, Senior Partner at Ostriker von Simson

== Controversies ==
=== Trashgate ===
In 2000, Oracle attracted attention from the computer industry and the press after hiring private investigators to uncover unfavorable information from organizations sympathetic to rival Microsoft. During the investigation, Oracle was accused of attempting to purchase trash from a janitor at the Association for Competitive Technology. This resulted in an antitrust trial against Microsoft.

The Chairman of Oracle Corporation, Larry Ellison, defended his company's hiring of an East Coast detective agency, calling the snooping a "public service". The investigation reportedly included a $1,200 offer to janitors at the Association for Competitive Technology to look through Microsoft's trash.

=== "Can't break it, can't break in" ===
In 2002, Oracle Corporation marketed many of its products using the slogan "Can't break it, can't break in", or "Unbreakable".

However, two weeks after its introduction, David Litchfield, Alexander Kornbrust, Cesar Cerrudo and others demonstrated a suite of successful attacks against Oracle products. Oracle Corporation's chief security officer Mary Ann Davidson said that, rather than representing a literal claim of Oracle's products' impregnability, she saw the campaign in the context of fourteen independent security evaluations that Oracle Corporation's database server had passed.

=== Relationship with John Ashcroft ===
In 2004, then-United States Attorney General John Ashcroft sued Oracle Corporation to prevent it from acquiring a multibillion-dollar intelligence contract. After Ashcroft's resignation from government, he founded a lobbying firm, The Ashcroft Group, which Oracle hired in 2005. With the group's help, Oracle went on to acquire the contract.

=== Cover Oregon Healthcare Exchange ===
Oracle Corporation was awarded a contract by the State of Oregon's Oregon Health Authority (OHA) to develop Cover Oregon, the state's healthcare exchange website, as part of the U.S. Patient Protection and Affordable Care Act. When the site tried to go live on October 1, 2013, it failed, and registrations had to be taken using paper applications until the site could be fixed.

In August 2014, Oracle Corporation sued Cover Oregon for breach of contract, and then later that month the state of Oregon sued Oracle Corporation, in a civil complaint for breach of contract, fraud, filing false claims and "racketeering". In September 2016, the two sides reached a settlement valued at over $100 million to the state, and a six-year agreement for Oracle to continue modernizing state software and IT.

=== Class action tracking lawsuit ===
In August 2022, a class action lawsuit was filed against Oracle by the law firm Lieff Cabraser. The lawsuit alleged that Oracle engaged in "deliberate and purposeful surveillance of the general population via their digital and online existence", specifically focusing on Oracle operating a surveillance machine that tracked and recorded personal data in real-time. The litigants alleged that through such surveillance, the company violated the Federal Electronic Communications Privacy Act, California's state constitution, the California Invasion of Privacy Act, competition law, and California Common Law.

The lawsuit was settled in July 2024 for $115 million.

=== Violations of the Foreign Corrupt Practices Act ===
Between 2011 and 2024, Oracle was investigated for engaging in bribery practices that violated the Foreign Corrupt Practices Act across its subsidiaries in South Africa, India, Turkey, and the United Arab Emirates. In all instances, the company settled with the United States Securities and Exchange Commission.

=== Reaction to the Gaza war ===
Following the beginning of the Gaza war in 2023, Oracle's top executives, including Safra Catz and Larry Ellison, publicly aligned the company with Israel's military operations. They issued statements of solidarity, paid double salaries to Israeli employees, and donated to organizations connected to Israel's wartime response. In 2024, Catz said to Israeli business news outlet CTech, "For employees, it's clear: if you're not for America or Israel, don't work here". In 2025, The Intercept spoke with Oracle employees who supported Palestine, but were afraid to speak out in their workplace. Sixty-eight Oracle employees signed an open letter criticizing the company's ties to Israel.

=== Fraud Accusations by the US Department of Justice ===
On July 29, 2010, the United States Department of Justice (DoJ) filed suit against Oracle Corporation alleging fraud. The lawsuit argues that the government received deals inferior to those Oracle gave to its commercial clients. The DoJ added its heft to an already existing whistleblower lawsuit filed by Paul Frascella, who was once senior director of contract services at Oracle. It was settled in 2011.

=== Lawsuit against Google ===
Oracle, the plaintiff, acquired ownership of the Java computer programming language when it acquired Sun Microsystems in January 2010. The Java software includes sets of pre-developed software code to allow programs and apps to accomplish common tasks in a consistent manner. The pre-developed code is organized into separate "packages" which each contain a set of "classes". Each class contains numerous methods, which instruct a program or app to do a certain task. Software developers "became accustomed to using Java's designations at the package, class, and method level".

Oracle and Google (the defendant) tried to negotiate an agreement for Oracle to license Java to Google, which would have allowed Google to use Java in developing programs for mobile devices using the Android operating system. However, the two companies never reached an agreement. After negotiations failed, Google created its own programming platform, which was based on Java, and contained 37 copied Java packages as well as new packages developed by Google.

=== HP and Oracle lawsuit ===
On June 15, 2011, HP filed a lawsuit in California Superior Court in Santa Clara, claiming that Oracle had breached an agreement to support the Itanium microprocessor used in HP's high-end enterprise servers. Oracle called the lawsuit "an abuse of the judicial process" and said that had it known SAP's Léo Apotheker was about to be hired as HP's new CEO, any support for HP's Itanium servers would not have been implied.

On August 1, 2012, a California judge said in a tentative ruling that Oracle must continue porting its software at no cost until HP discontinues its sales of Itanium-based servers. HP was awarded $3 billion in damages against Oracle in 2016. HP argued Oracle's canceling support damaged HP's Itanium server brand. Oracle had announced that it would appeal both the decision and damages, but the decision stayed.

=== GSA business bidding ban ===
On April 20, 2012, the US General Services Administration banned Oracle from the most popular portal for bidding on GSA contracts for undisclosed reasons. Oracle has previously used this portal for around four hundred million dollars a year in revenue. In 2011, Oracle settled with the General Services Administration for $199.5 million in a lawsuit filed under the False Claims Act.

== Events and acquisitions ==
=== Acquisition of Sun Microsystems ===
In January 2010, Oracle completed its acquisition of Sun Microsystems, valued at more than $7 billion, a move that transformed Oracle from solely a software company to a manufacturer of both software and hardware. The acquisition was delayed for several months by the European Commission because of concerns about MySQL, but was unconditionally approved in the end. In September 2011, U.S. State Department Embassy cables were leaked to WikiLeaks. One cable revealed that the U.S. pressured the E.U. to allow Oracle to acquire Sun.

The Sun acquisition was closely watched by free software users and some companies, due to the fear that Oracle might end Sun's traditional support of free projects. Since the acquisition, Oracle has discontinued OpenSolaris and StarOffice, and sued Google over the Java patents Oracle acquired from Sun.

=== Cerner acquisition ===
On December 20, 2021, Oracle announced that it agreed to acquire Cerner Corporation (now Oracle Health and Oracle Life Sciences) for approximately US$28.3 billion, creating a dedicated Industry Business Unit within the company. Cerner is the largest international supplier of health information technology, such as electronic health records (EHR), revenue cycle solutions, and biomedical device integration platforms, and has its headquarters in Kansas City, Missouri, US. The deal closed in early July 2022 after receiving final approval from European regulators, making it Oracle's largest acquisition and one of the largest in corporate history.

Oracle's purchase of Cerner was part of an effort to introduce Oracle products into the healthcare market, particularly in the United States although Oracle plans to expand Cerner's global operations.

In September 2024, Oracle announced new investments and the release of Oracle Clinical Digital Assistant, a generative AI system that automatically creates consultation documentation and proposes orders.

Oracle has acquired the following technology companies:

1. PeopleSoft (2005), an ERP company
2. Siebel (2006), a CRM company
3. BEA Systems (2008), an enterprise infrastructure software company
4. Dyn (2016), an internet infrastructure company
5. DataFox (2018), a predictive intelligence software company
6. Datascience (2018), a data analysis company
7. Iridize (2018), a user training company
8. LiveData Utilities (2020), a utilities network management company
9. GloriaFood (2021), an online ordering and marketing company
10. Adi Insights (2022), a workforce management solution company
11. FOEX (2022), a software development company for enterprise web application creation

=== Oracle Health data breach ===
In March 2025, a threat actor claimed to have stolen 6 million data records from Oracle Health (formerly Cerner). Oracle claimed that its Oracle Cloud Infrastructure was not breached and that no customer data from it was exposed. Some legacy Cerner servers experienced unauthorized access, but Oracle has not confirmed the scale of impact. In April 2025, the Cybersecurity and Infrastructure Security Agency (CISA) issued a warning to Oracle customers to secure their environments.

=== U.S. TikTok's operations ===
On September 13, 2020, Bloomberg News reported that Oracle won a bidding war with other U.S.-based companies to take over social media company TikTok's operations in the United States following the company's pressure to forcibly be shut down by the Trump administration. Oracle was described as a "trusted tech partner" by TikTok. On September 19, 2020, the Trump administration approved of the sale of TikTok's US operations to Oracle "[delaying] — by one week — restrictions that were originally to take effect" on September 20 as indicated by the United States Department of Commerce.

As September 25, 2025, TikTok was bought by Silver Lake and Abu Dhabi's MGX. Oracle will own 45% of the app in the US, and ByteDance 35% after delays with the ban for the 4th time.

Oracle will store data of US TikTok users on its cloud computers, and it will be involved in the new TikTok spinoff's cybersecurity.

=== Anduril partnership ===
Oracle partnered with the arms company Anduril Industries to provide their Lattice military software platform to the governments of United States, United Kingdom and Australia.

== Offices ==
Oracle Corporation's world headquarters are located in Austin, Texas. In April 2024, Oracle announced plans to build its largest office hub, with 8,500 jobs, in Nashville, Tennessee.

Oracle has a large office complex located on the San Francisco Peninsula in the Redwood Shores area of Redwood City. This complex was home to Oracle world headquarters from 1989 to 2020. It is located on the former site of Marine World/Africa USA, which moved from Redwood Shores to Vallejo in 1986. Oracle Corporation originally leased two buildings on the Oracle Parkway site, moving its finance and administration departments from the corporation's former headquarters on Davis Drive, Belmont, California. Eventually, Oracle purchased the complex and constructed four additional buildings.

The distinctive Oracle Parkway buildings, nicknamed the Emerald City, served as sets for the futuristic headquarters of the fictional company "NorthAm Robotics" in the Robin Williams film Bicentennial Man (1999). The campus also represented the headquarters of Cyberdyne Systems in the movie Terminator Genisys (2015).

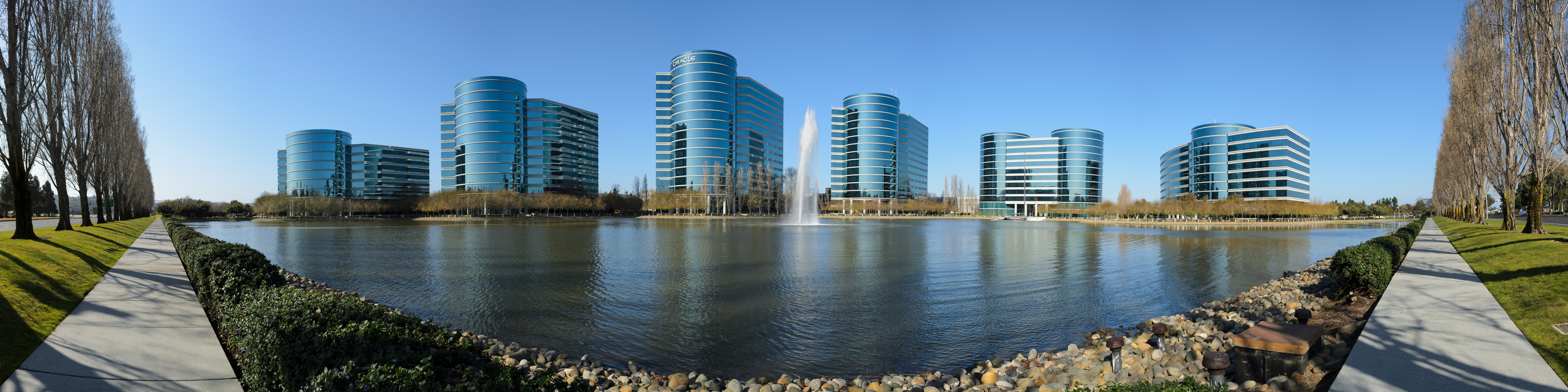
Oracle offices and former headquarters in Redwood Shores, California
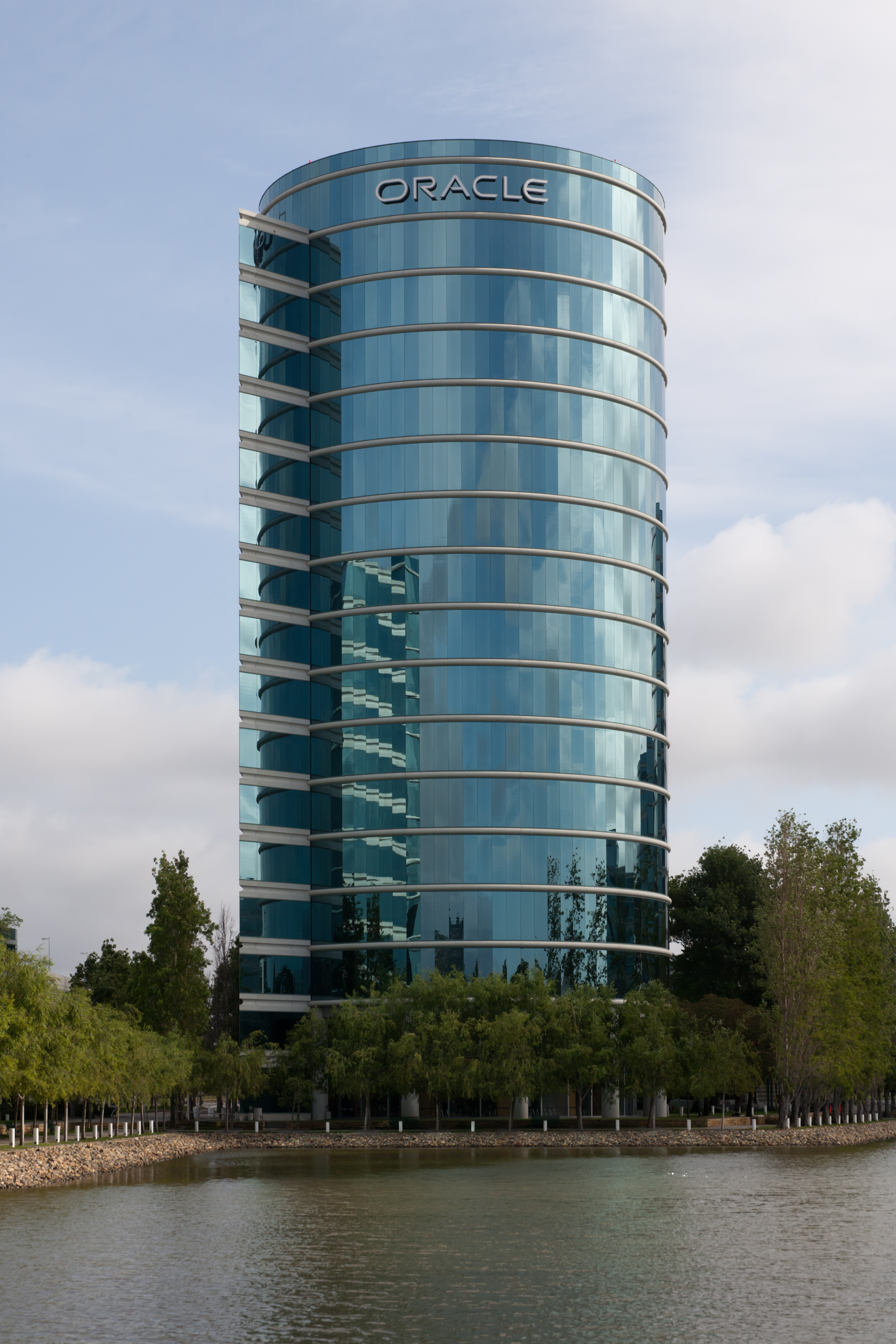
300 Oracle Parkway in Redwood Shores

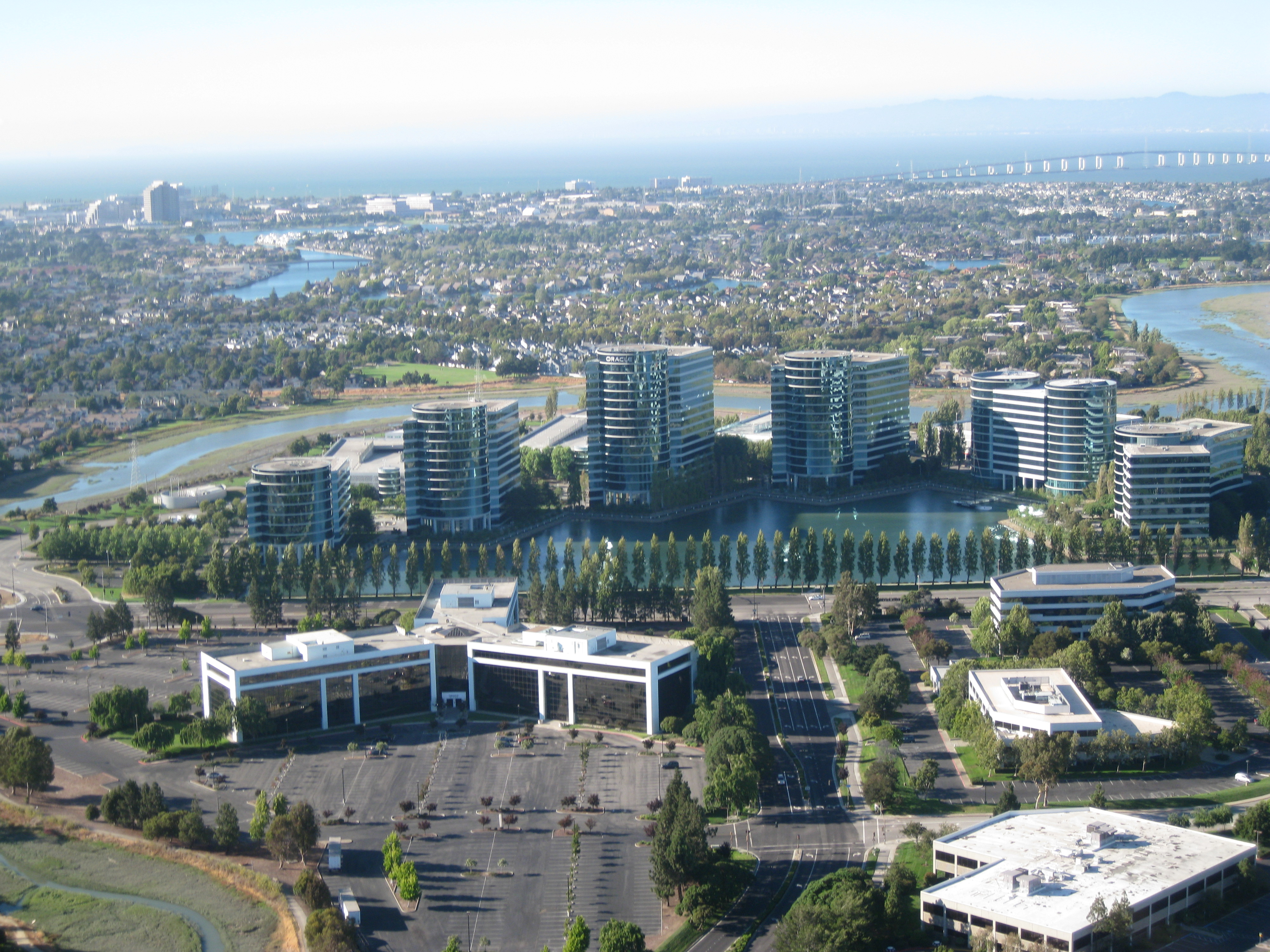
Oracle offices in Redwood Shores, with Oracle Plaza building in left foreground

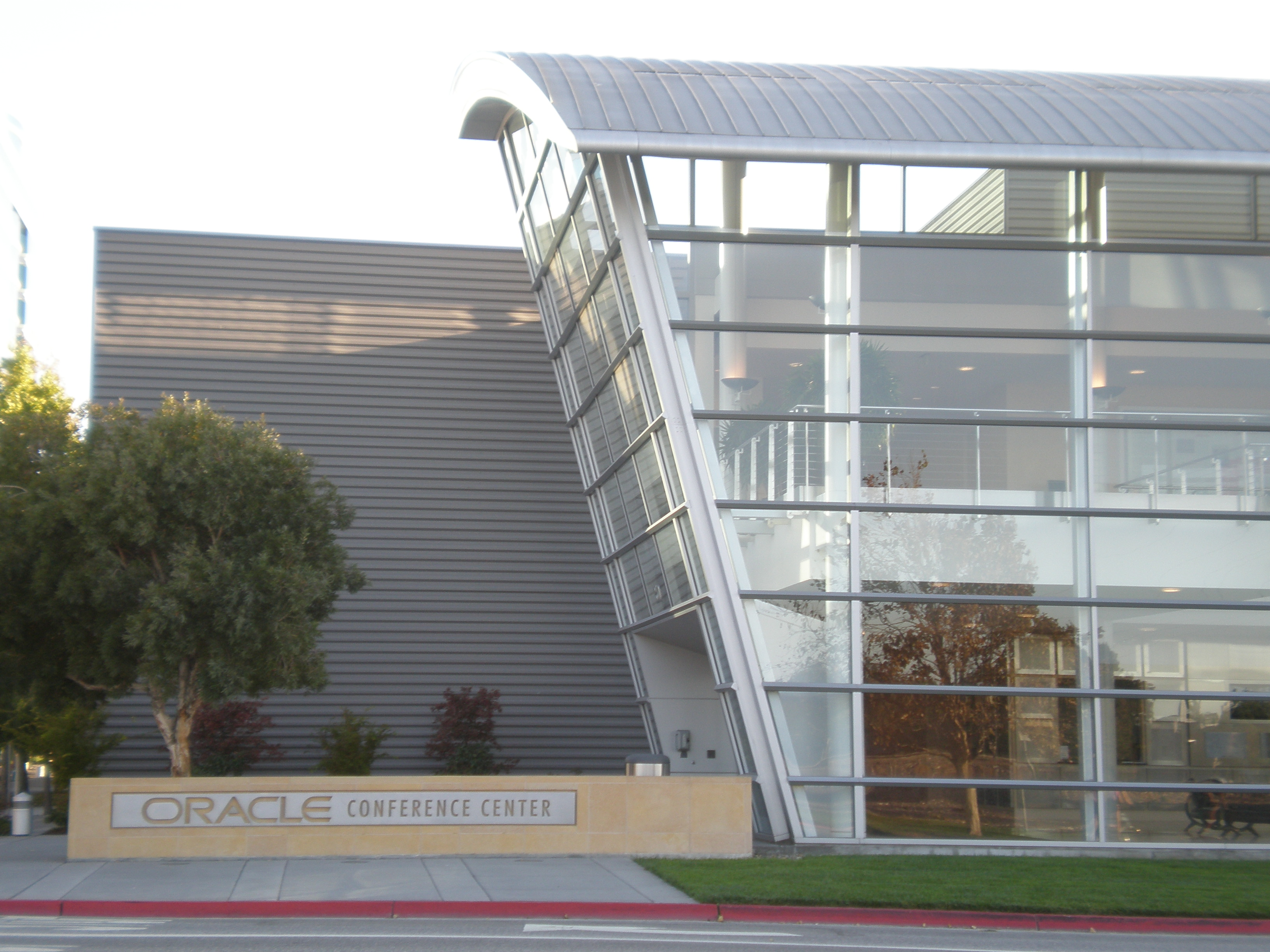
Oracle Conference Center in Redwood Shores

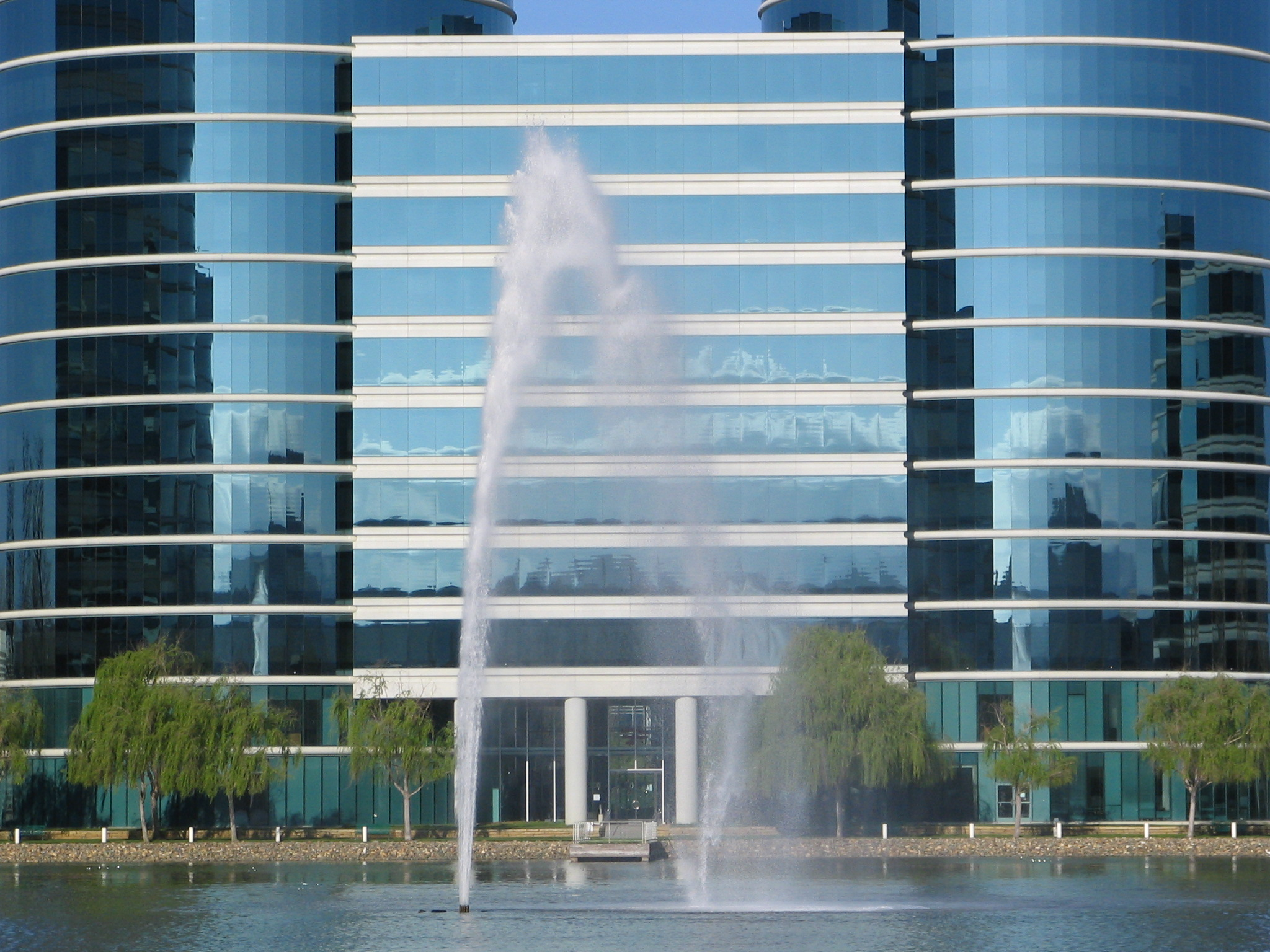
Fountain in the Oracle lake, Redwood Shores

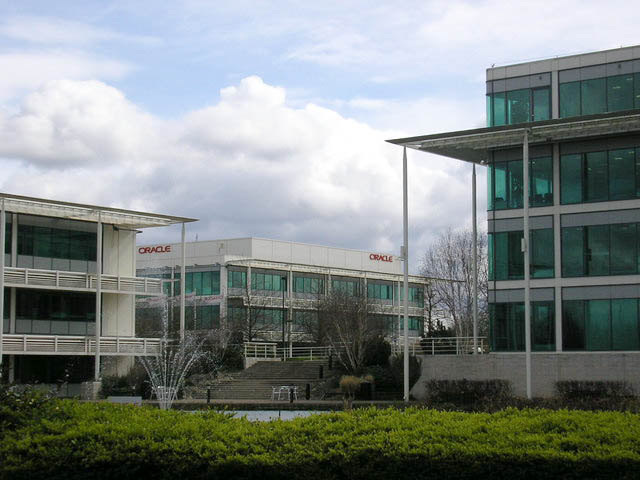
Oracle has a major business campus at Thames Valley Park in Reading in England

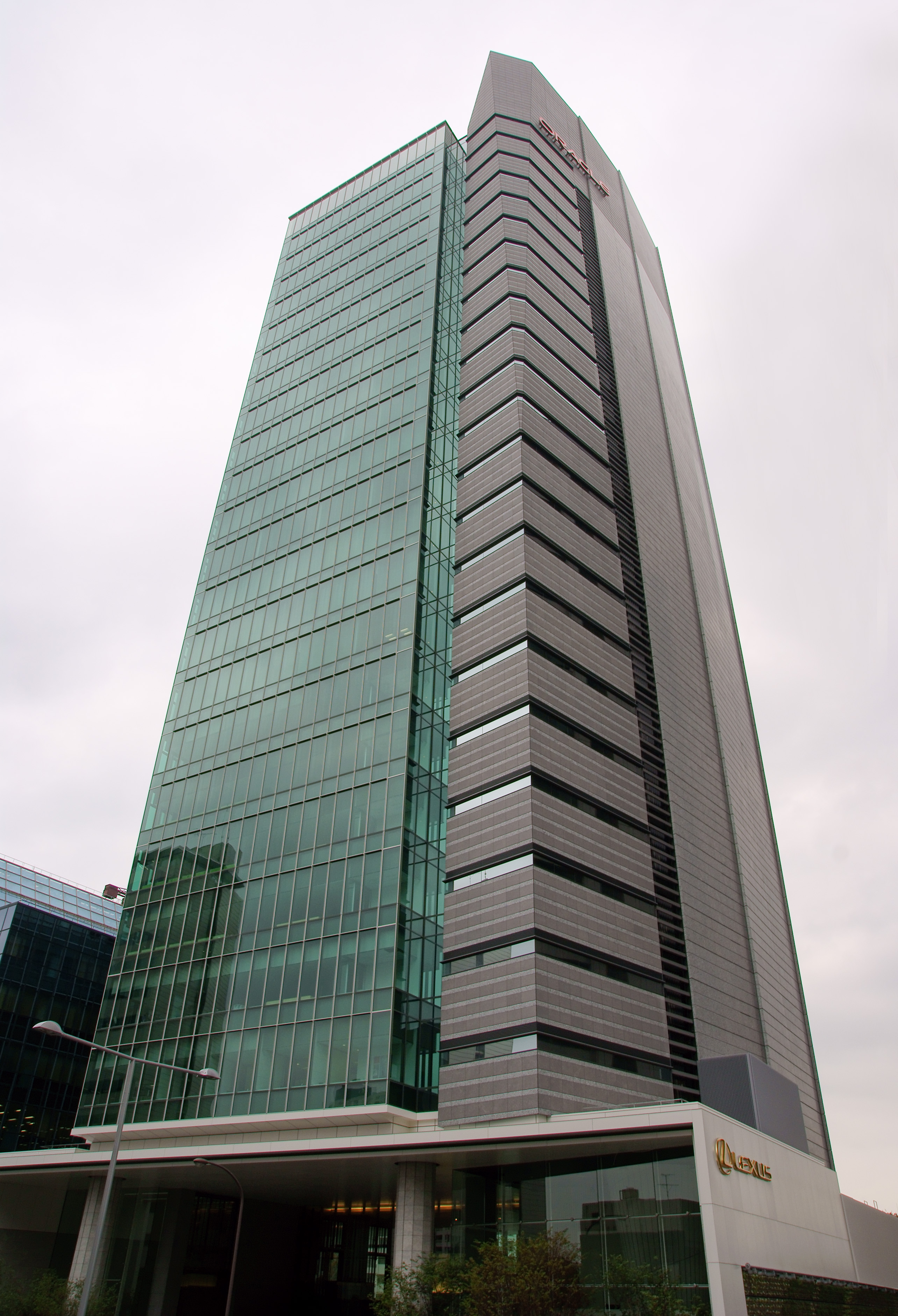
Oracle Aoyama Center Building, with Lexus International Gallery Aoyama

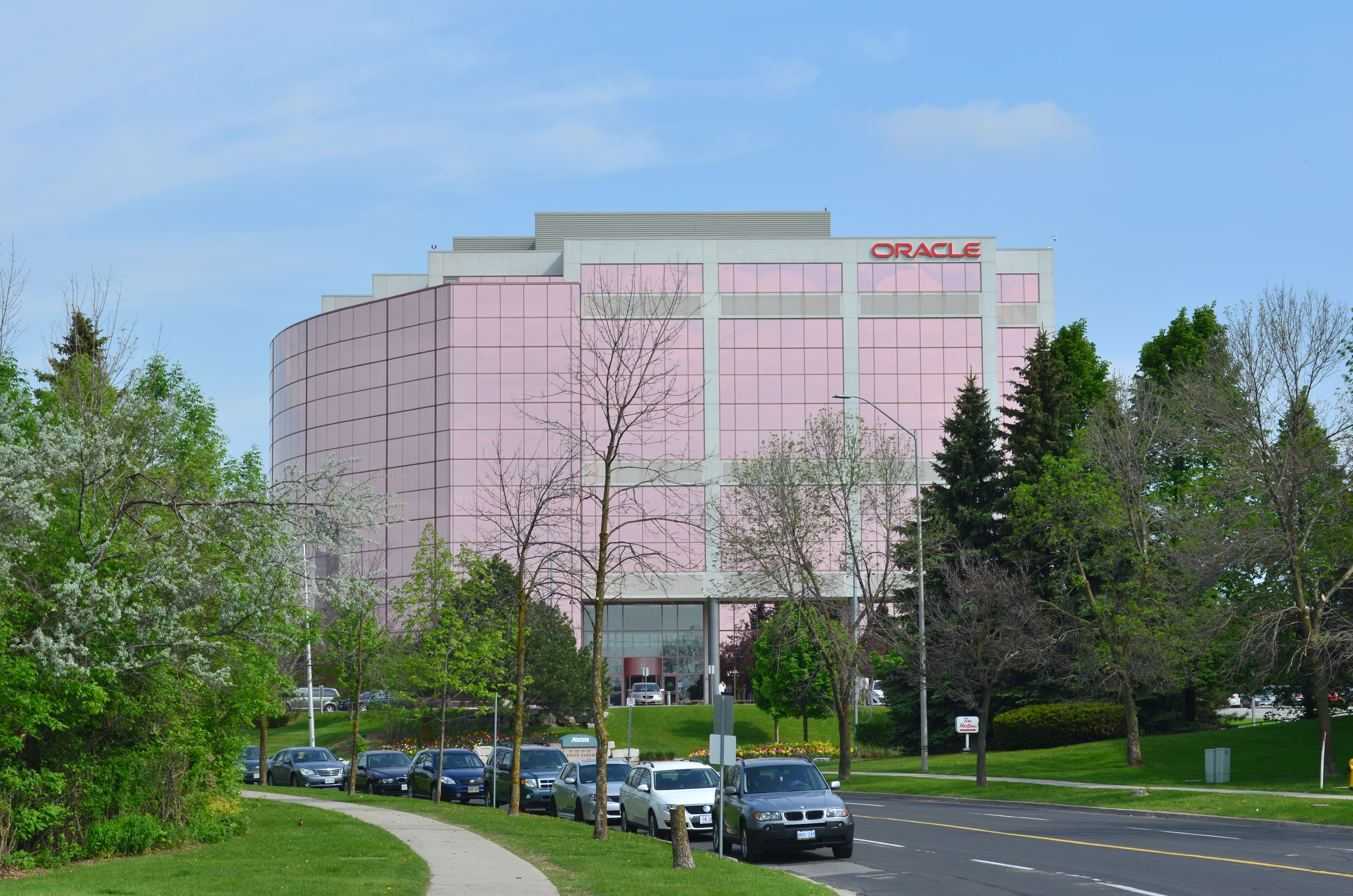
Oracle in Markham, Ontario

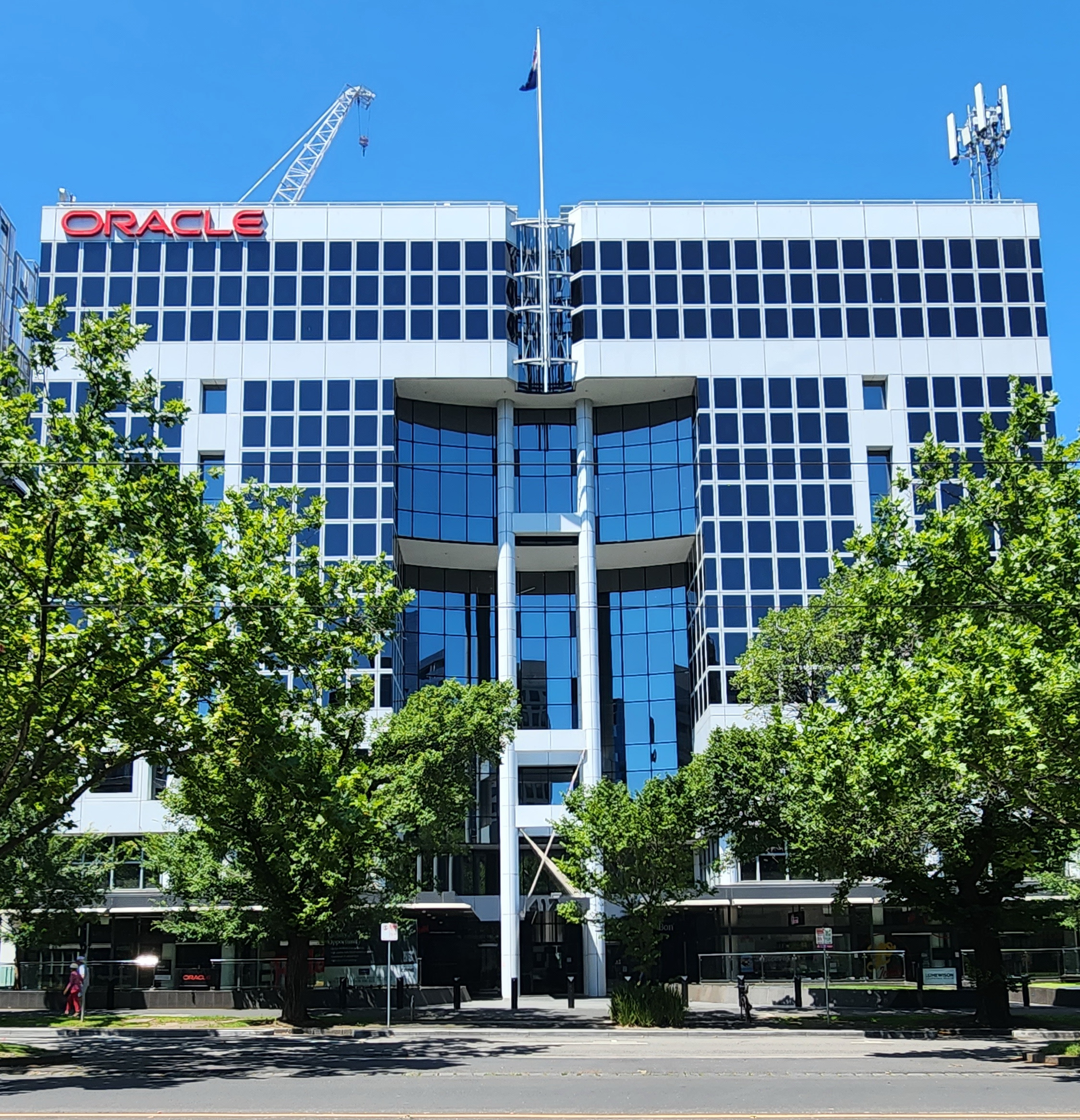
Oracle office in Melbourne, Australia

== Corporate structures ==
Oracle Corporation operates in multiple markets and has acquired many companies to help it do so. In some cases these companies became the starting points for global business units (GBUs) targeting particular vertical markets. Oracle Corporation's GBUs include:

- Communications
- Construction and engineering (formerly the Primavera GBU)
- Energy and Water
- Financial services
- Food and Beverages
- Health sciences
- Hospitality
- Retail

== Sponsorships ==
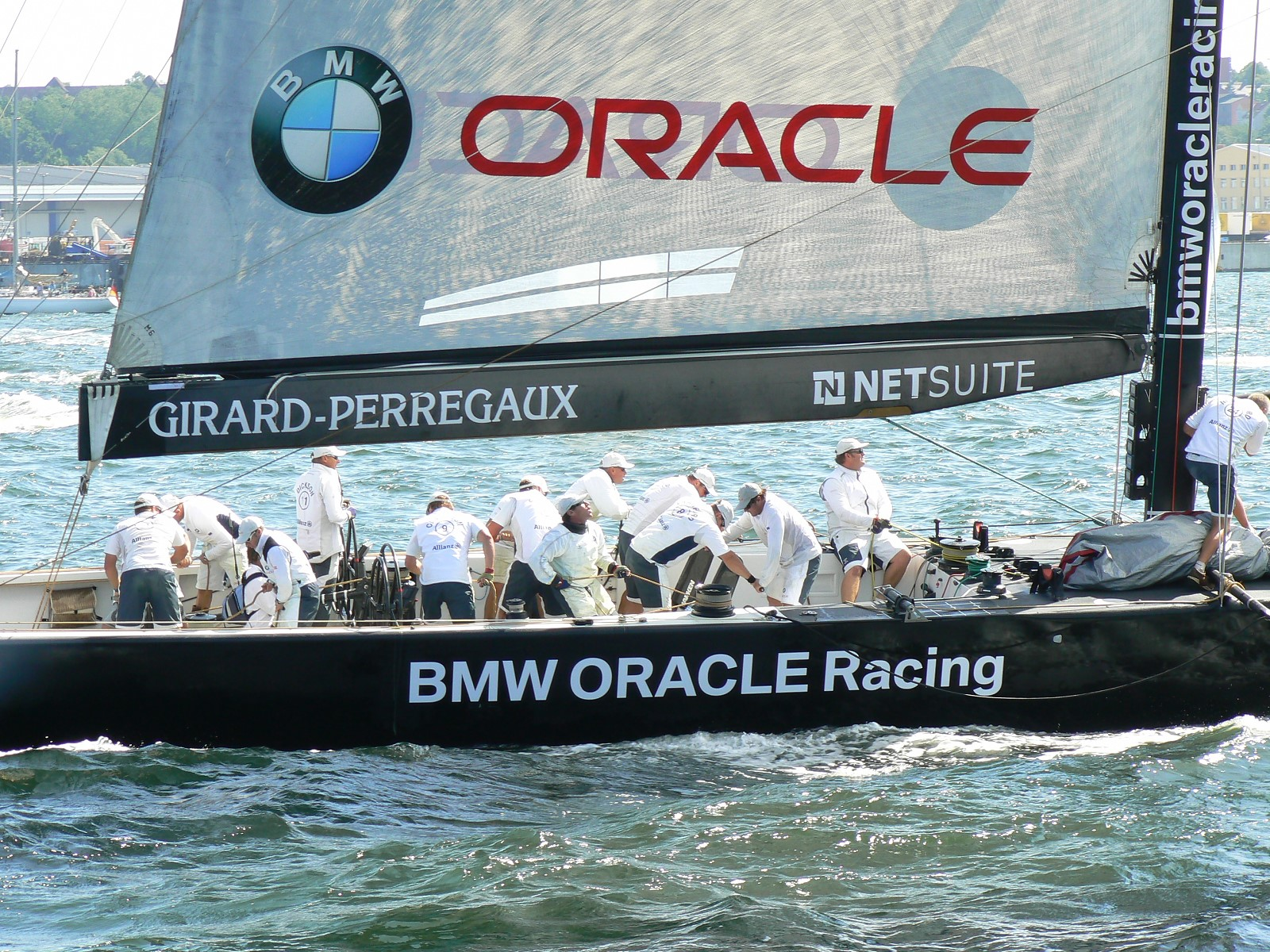
BMW Oracle Racing USA-71, at the German Sailing Grand Prix Kiel 2006. It was moored at Oracle headquarters in Redwood Shores, California, until 2014.

In 1994 and 1995, Oracle sponsored Benetton Formula.

From 2001 to 2021, Sean Tucker's stunt biplane was sponsored by Oracle and performed frequently at air shows around the US.

In October 2006, the Golden State Warriors and the Oracle Corporation announced a 10-year agreement in which the Oakland Arena would become known as the Oracle Arena. The agreement ended after the 2018–2019 NBA season when the Warriors relocated to the Chase Center in San Francisco. In January 2019, the San Francisco Giants entered into a 20-year agreement to rename its stadium Oracle Park.

Larry Ellison's sailing team competes as Oracle Team USA. The team won the America's Cup twice, in 2010 (as BMW Oracle Racing) and in 2013, despite being penalized for cheating.

From the 2022 Formula One season, Oracle signed a five-year deal worth $500 million to become title sponsors of Red Bull Racing, after already being a sponsor effective from the 2021 season.

== See also ==
- Cover Oregon
- Oracle Applications
- Oracle Certification Program
- Oracle Clinical
- Oracle Database
- Oracle Linux
- Oracle User Group
