= Jasmine Anteunis =

French entrepreneur

- Occupation: Businesswoman

Jasmine Anteunis is a French entrepreneur who co-founded Recast.AI.

== Biography ==
=== Education ===
Anteunis first studied arts at the Institut Supérieur des Arts Appliqués and Ecole Supérieure d'Art d'Aix-en-Provence before joining the first edition of 42.

=== Career ===
At the end of her training at 42, Anteunis launched a startup called Recast.AI with co-founders Julien Blancher, Paul Renvoisé, and Patrick Joubert. In June 2016, Recast.AI raised 2 million euros from business angels, including Kima Ventures, a fund managed by Xavier Niel. The startup was bought by SAP in March 2018.

Jasmine Anteunis co‑founded a ceramics venture, "Minuit Céramique" (Midnight Ceramic) in December 2020.

== Recognitions ==
Anteunis was named by Forbes as one of Europe's 50 Top Women in Tech in 2018.
