= MaXware =

Identity management software company

- Company type: Private
- Founded: Trondheim (1998)
- Founder: Tore Wold
- Headquarters: Lade, Trondheim, Norway
- Area served: Worldwide
- Key people: Tore Wold; (CEO); Tor Even Dahl; (CTO); Thor Alf Gilbrant; (Consultant); Elliott Friedman; (MD USA); Marcus Lasance; (MD UK)

MaXware AS , was a provider of identity management, virtual directory and federation solutions. The company was located in Norway, the United Kingdom, Australia and the United States.

Maxware AS was sold to SAP AG in May 2007.

MaXware was best known for its two flagship products the Directory Synchronisation Engine (DSE) and Virtual Directory Server (MVD), which is designed specifically for deployment in high-volume, high-complexity environments. MaXware’s MVD acts as an abstraction layer, extracting identity and context information out of various application and data silos. By re-mapping the underlying sources and presenting the identity data in customized views for the needs of enterprise applications, MVD enabled authentication and fine-grained authorization for identity management and context-driven applications.

MaXware’s global customer base included companies in the fields of banking, finance, insurance, government, communications, manufacturing, education, entertainment and healthcare. Headquartered in Trondheim, Norway, MaXware had satellite offices in Freehold, NJ and Ipswich, UK, and distribution channels throughout the world.

== History ==
The history of the MaXware product range started at Norsk Data (ND). When ND discontinued NOTIS office software development in 1989. Former ND employees founded the company NOTIS AS. Simultaneously, Televerket (now Telenor) spun off its email and directories client work in another Norwegian startup, MaXware AS. In 1996, the two companies merged, and continued under the name Maxware to enforce the successful brand name.

The product that is currently known as SAP NetWeaver Identity Management had its origins in 1995, as a project for Swedish Post, who needed a user management tool for its x.500 Directory service. The X.500 standard did not concern itself in how users were added or deleted from the directory. The management tool was called 'Add-On Service' (as in add on for a directory service), but soon changed the name to MDDM (MaXware Directory Data Manager). Later it was again renamed to DSE (Data Synchronisation Engine). The Virtual Directory Server (MVD) had a similar evolution.

Some people from the MaXware development team from 1995 are still working with the product at SAP Labs in Trondheim.

MaXware AS an Independent software vendor company, started in 1998, as a joint venture between EDB Business Partner and founder Tore Wold under the name MaXware International AS (MIAS). MIAS acquired all messaging products and the development team from EDB MaXware AS in 2001. In 2002, the MIAS management team together with its employees completed a Management buyout of the remaining shares from EDB MaXware AS. MIAS changed its name to MaXware AS in 2004. MaXware AS soon became a globally recognised innovator in developing identity management solutions. During this period the company established its subsidiaries in US, United Kingdom and Australia.

Series A round funding was received from Viking venture and Four Seasons Venture. The VC companies were tasked to develop a successful exit strategy, when the Idm Market started to consolidate.

MaXware AS was acquired by SAP AG in 2007. The products live on as SAP NetWeaver Identity Management and continue to be used by some of the largest corporations and governmental agencies in the world.

In 2014, SAP AG merged the Trondheim office with SAP Labs in Sofia, Bulgaria, and closed the Norway office, marking the end of 20+ years of Identity Management development in Norway.

== Products and awards ==
MaXware is known for its X.400 secure messaging solutions and Identity Management solutions:

- Mailmax.400 - Mailmax.400 was a very popular X.400 messaging software It is still sold and supported by AddOnMail
- MaXware Directory Explorer (MDE) - One of the first freeware LDAP browsers
- MaXware Directory Synchronisation Engine (DSE) - MaXware’s entry level meta directory product, which was re-sold in the UK by Nexor.
- MaXware Identity Center (MIC) - MaXware’s flagship product for corporate Identity Integration using Oracle and SQL Server RDBMS
- MaXware Virtual Directory (MVD) - MaXware’s virtual directory flagship product

Award: PKI Challenge (pkiC) The reference implementation was developed and supplied for the pki Challenge by Utimaco, and the Directory used was produced and supplied by MaXware.
