= Virsa Systems =

- Type: Private
- Industry: Compliance software
- Founded: 1996
- Headquarters: 47257 Fremont Boulevard, Fremont, CA 94538
- Key people: Jasvir Gill, CEO
- Products: Compliance One, Network Enforcer
- Website: www.virsa.com

Virsa Systems was a California-based compliance software maker. It now forms the Governance, Risk Management, and Compliance (GRC) vertical of SAP Labs.

== History ==
Virsa Systems was founded by Jasvir Gill, a software engineer based in Silicon Valley. The Virsa tool was substantially based on a tool developed by PricewaterhouseCoopers, known as SAFE, which was purchased by Virsa in December 2004. The SAFE tool was a preventative, automated tool developed to control the granting and management of access within SAP.

On 3 April 2006, SAP AG announced its decision to acquire Virsa Systems. According to the press release, the acquisition was a part of its creation of a new business unit to provide customers with end-to-end solutions for GRC.

== See also ==
- Risk management
