= Judgment as a matter of law =

United States legal procedure

In the United States courts, a motion for judgment as a matter of law (JMOL) is a motion made by a party, during trial, claiming the opposing party has insufficient evidence to reasonably support its case. It asserts that the evidence allows only one result: victory for the moving party, even if a jury has found otherwise. JMOL is also known as a directed verdict, which it has replaced in American federal courts.

JMOL is similar to judgment on the pleadings and summary judgment, all of which test the factual sufficiency of a claim. Judgment on the pleadings is a motion made after pleading and before discovery; summary judgment happens after discovery and before trial; JMOL occurs during trial.

In United States federal courts, JMOL is a creation of Rule 50 of the Federal Rules of Civil Procedure. JMOL is decided by the standard of whether a reasonable jury could find in favor of the party opposing the JMOL motion. If there is no evidence to support a reasonable conclusion for the opposing party, judgment is entered by the court and the case is over. If there is sufficient evidence to make a reasonable conclusion in favor of the opposing party, but there is equally strong evidence to support an opposite conclusion, the party with the burden of persuasion fails.

Timing is very important in making a motion for JMOL; the motion can be made only after the opposing party has presented its case. In civil cases, the plaintiff presents its case, the defendant presents its case, and the plaintiff may present a rebuttal. Therefore, once the plaintiff has presented its case, the defendant but not the plaintiff can move for JMOL. However, once the defendant has finished presenting its case, both the plaintiff and the defendant can move for JMOL.

JMOL motions may also be made after the jury has returned its verdict and are then called renewed judgment as a matter of law (RJMOL). An RJMOL is a party's second chance at a JMOL motion, and is a motion to have that verdict altered. In U.S. federal courts this procedure has replaced judgment notwithstanding the verdict (JNOV) through Rule 50 of the Federal Rules of Civil Procedure, and RJMOL are sometimes still called JNOV (from English: judgement and Latin: non obstante veredicto).

Renewed JMOL can only be raised before a jury begins deliberations. Seventh Amendment due process concerns demand this formality, as decided by the United States Supreme Court in Baltimore & Carolina Line, Inc. v. Redman, 295 U.S. 654 (1935).

== See also ==
- New trial
- No case to answer
