= POSC Caesar =

Organization

POSC Caesar Association
- Logo for POSC Caesar Association.
- Abbreviation: PCA
- Formation: 1997-11-14
- Legal status: Association
- Purpose: Promote the development of open specifications to be used as standards for enabling the interoperability of data, software and related matters
- Location: Bærum, Norway
- Region served: Worldwide
- Members: 36
- Official language: English
- General Manager: Nils Sandsmark
- Main organ: Board of Directors
- Website: https://www.posccaesar.org

POSC Caesar Association (PCA) is an international, open and not-for-profit, member organization that promotes the development of open specifications to be used as standards for enabling the interoperability of data, software and related matters.

PCA is the initiator of ISO 15926 "Integration of life-cycle data for process plants including oil and gas production facilities" and is committed to its maintenance and enhancement.

Nils Sandsmark has been the General Manager of POSC Caesar Association since 1999 and Thore Langeland, Norwegian Oil Industry Association (Norwegian: Oljeindustriens Landsforening, OLF), is the chairman of the board.

== History ==
=== Caesar Offshore ===
The first predecessor of POSC Caesar Association, the Caesar Offshore program, started in 1993. The original focus was on standardizing technical data definitions for capital intensive projects at the handover from the EPC contractor to the owner/operators of onshore and offshore oil and gas production facilities. The program was sponsored by The Research Council of Norway, two EPC contractors (Aker Maritime and Kværner), three owners/operators (Norsk Hydro, Saga Petroleum and Statoil) and DNV as service provider and project owner.

=== POSC Caesar project ===
During the period 1994–96, Caesar Offshore Program was defined as a project of Petrotechnical Open Software Corporation (POSC) (now Energistics), and changed its name to the POSC Caesar Project.

In 1995 the project was joined by BP, Brown and Root and Elf Aquitaine and in 1997 by Intergraph, IBM, Oracle, Lloyd's, Shell, ABB and UMOE Technologies.

During that time, POSC Caesar also became a member of European Process Industries STEP Technical Liaison Executive (EPISTLE) where it collaborates with PISTEP (UK), and USPI-NL (The Netherlands) on the development of ISO 10303, also known as "Standard for the Exchange of Product model data (STEP)".

=== POSC Caesar Association ===
In 1997, POSC Caesar Association was founded as an independent, global, non-profit, member organization. POSC Caesar Association serves an international membership and collaborates with other international organizations. It has its main office in Norway.

Albeit the name of POSC Caesar Association still hints to its past as a project within the Petrotechnical Open Software Corporation (POSC) (now Energistics), from 1997 onwards, the organization has been independent. Energistics and POSC Caesar Association do collaborate, and are formally member in each other's organization.

== Membership ==
POSC Caesar Association has with its current 36 members from around the world and has established an international footprint (with a strong membership in Norway) that includes a variety of backgrounds, from academia and solution providers to engineering contractors and owners/operators. The members are (subdivided by organization type):

- Associations: Energistics (USA) and The Norwegian Oil Industry Association (OLF, Norway);
- Universities and Research Institutes: International Research Institute of Stavanger (IRIS, Norway), Norwegian University of Science and Technology (NTNU, Norway), Korea Advanced Institute of Science and Technology (KAIST, Korea), SINTEF (Norway), University of Bergen (Norway), University of Oslo (Norway), University of Stavanger (Norway), University of Tromsø (Norway) and Western Norway Research Institute (Norway);
- Oil and Gas Companies: BP (UK), Petronas (Malaysia) and Statoil (Norway);
- Engineering contractors and consultants: Akvaplan-niva (Norway), Aker Solutions (Norway), Asset Life Cycle Information Management (ALCIM, Malaysia), CAESAR systems (USA), Bechtel (USA), Det Norske Veritas (DNV, Norway), Information Logic (USA) and iXIT Engineering Technology (Germany), Phusion IM Ltd (UK);
- Solution providers: Aveva (UK), Bentley Systems (USA), Jotne EPM Technology (Norway), Epsis (Norway), Eurostep (Sweden), International Business Machines Corporation (IBM, USA), Siemens - Comos Industry Solutions (before Innotec) (Germany), Intergraph (USA), Invenia (Norway), Keel Solution (Denmark), Noumenon (UK), NRX (Canada), Octaga (Norway) and Tektonisk (Norway).

In general, the organization holds three membership meetings a year; one in January / February in North-America (typically USA), one in April / May in Europe (typically Norway) and one in October in Asia (typically Malaysia).

== Activities and services ==
=== Initiator and custodian of ISO 15926 ===
In consultation with the other EPISTLE members and the International Organization for Standardization (ISO), it was decided in 2003 (some say already in 1997) that for modeling-technical reasons it was better to discontinue the development of ISO 10303 and to initiate the development of ISO 15926 "Integration of life-cycle data for process plants including oil and gas production facilities."

Over the years, the scope of the standard has increased from the initial capital-intensive projects in the upstream oil and gas industry, to include also relevant terminology for downstream oil and gas industry applications and to deal with real-time data related to the actual oil and gas production.

ISO 15926 has also over the years evolved from a dictionary (a list of terms with definitions), over a taxonomy (added hierarchy) to an ontology (a formal representation of a set of concepts within a domain and the relationships between those concepts). ISO 15926 is therefore sometimes nicknamed the "Oil and Gas Ontology", for some considered to be an essential prerequisite together with Semantic Web technologies to get to better interoperability, an optimal use of all available data across boundaries and an increase in efficiency. This is what some call the next generation of Integrated Operations.

=== Reference data services ===
Placeholders:

- Flow scheme of WIP - RDS - ISO and role of SIGs
- RDS
- Standards in database pilot (ISO)

=== Special interest groups ===
Placeholders:

- Overview of SIGs
- Drilling and Completion
- Reservoir and Production
- Operations and Maintenance

== Projects ==
There are a number of projects (co-)organized by POSC Caesar Association working on the extension of the ISO 15926 standard in different application areas.

=== Capital intensive projects application domain ===
The following projects are running at the moment (August 2009):

- The ADI Project of FIATECH, to build the tools (which will then be made available in the public domain)
- The IDS Project of POSC Caesar Association, to define product models required for data sheets
- A joint collaboration project between FIATECH POSC Caesar Association is the ADI-IDS project is the ISO 15926 WIP

=== Upstream oil and gas industry application domain ===
The following projects are currently running (August 2009):

- The Integrated Operations in the High North (IOHN) project is working on extending ISO 15926 to handle real-time data transmission and (pre-)processing to enable the next generation of Integrated Operations.
- The Environment Web project to include environmental reporting terms and definitions as used in EPIM's EnvironmentWeb in ISO 15926.

Finalised projects include:

- The Integrated Information Platform (IIP) project working on establishing a real-time information pipeline based on open standards. It worked among others on:
  - Daily Drilling Report (DDR) to including all terms and definitions in ISO 15926. This standard became mandatory on February 1, 2008 for reporting on the Norwegian Continental Shelf by the Norwegian Petroleum Directorate (NPD) and Safety Authority Norway (PSA). NPD says that the quality of the reports has improved considerably since.
  - Daily Production Report (DPR) to including all terms and definitions in ISO 15926. This standard was tested successfully on the Valhall (BP-operated) and Åsgard (StatoilHydro-operated) fields offshore Norway. The terminology and XML schemata developed have also been included in Energistics’ PRODML standard.

== Collaborations ==
POSC Caesar is collaborating with a number of standardization bodies, including:

- Mimosa: collaboration on open information standards for Operations and Maintenance mainly for the downstream oil and gas industry;
- FIATECH: collaboration on open information standards for life cycle data of capital projects;
- Energistics: collaboration on information standards for the upstream oil and gas industry, including WITSML and PRODML;
- OASIS: collaboration on e-business standards;
- ISO TC184/SC4: the host of the ISO 15926 standard.

== See also ==
- ISO 15926
