= Laas =

Laas may refer to:

== People ==
- Endel Laas (1915–2009), Estonian forest scientist and professor
- Ernst Laas (1837–1885), German philosopher
- Hendrik Laas (1862–1919), Estonian agriculturalist and publisher
- Karl Laas (actor) (1892–after 1944), Estonian actor
- Karl Laas (runner) (1908–1967), Estonian long-distance runner
- Mait Laas (born 1970), Estonian animated film director
- Valdek Laas (1949–1999), Estonian serial killer and serial rapist

== Places ==
=== France ===
- Laas, Gers
- Laas, Loiret
- Laàs, in the Pyrénées-Atlantiques département

=== Elsewhere ===
- Laas (Greece), a city of ancient Laconia
- Laas, South Tyrol, a municipality in South Tyrol, Italy

== Acronym ==
- Laboratory for Analysis and Architecture of Systems, a research laboratory linked with the French National Centre for Scientific Research
- Local-area augmentation system, an aircraft landing system
- Lighting as a service (LaaS)
- Logging as a service (LaaS)
