= Knowledge as a service =

Providing digitized knowledge as a service

Knowledge as a service (KaaS) is a computing service that delivers information to users, backed by a knowledge model, which might be drawn from a number of possible models based on decision trees, association rules, or neural networks. A knowledge as a service provider responds to knowledge requests from users through a centralised knowledge server, and provides an interface between users and data owners.

KaaS is one of several cloud computing-dependent business models in which computer resources are sold on an on-demand and pay-as-you-use basis.

== Overview ==
At the International Semantic Web Conference 2019, it was described how knowledge can be made live and evolve on the web allowing users to learn directly from elaborated knowledge, now appearing in the form of knowledge graphs. KaaS appear when knowledge graphs are accessed via services This is opposed to DaaS which might "compute large volumes of data; integrate and analyzes that data; and publish it in real-time, using Web service APIs" (from Data as a Service) where the KaaS is able to exploit context - both the context of the user in relation to their information requests of the KaaS (where and when they make the request) and also the context of the information in relation to some objective or purpose of the users either understood by the KaaS automatically or indicated to it by the user.

== Differentiating knowledge from data ==
Conceptual models that make such a differentiation such as the so-called DIKW pyramid have existed for perhaps more than 40 years (see a 1974 journal article about this) however definitions are not stable and universally accepted (see the discussion about the conceptualizations of DIKW within the DIKW Wikipedia article that question value of wisdom). The knowledge component of DIKW is generally agreed to be an elusive concept which is difficult to define, however Rowley 2007, in a well known student textbook differentiated knowledge from data by stating that knowledge is "defined with reference to information" and that it contains more than just facts but also "beliefs and expectations".

In relation to knowledge graphs, knowledge may be additional content they provide over and above pure data which is the definition of the categories, properties and relations between the concepts, data and entities that substantiate one, many or all domains of discourse (see the definition of Ontology).

The ability to represent "beliefs and expectations", or other forms of not so straightforwardly explicit knowledge is an on-going area of improvement in information sciences (see Tacit knowledge) and, with relation to KaaS, the establishment of recent informatics mechanics to do so it critical to the legitimacy of KaaS as it is differentiated from just value-added DaaS.

Knowledge graphs' ability to represent context via the definition of the categories, properties and relations between the concepts, data and entities that substantiate one, many or all domains of discourse that they provide (see the definition of Ontology) has led to the idea that supplying access to KNs might be a required competency of a KaaS.

== Delivery of knowledge ==
Much service-delivered content is dependent on a session to provide much of the context that the user (client) needs to understand answers to questions. For example, using current HTTP internet protocols, a GET request to retrieve information identified by a URI, such as a web page, a client (a human or a machine) may have access information supplied automatically to enable that client to bypass paywalls or other content access controls. Such context, in this case about the client's information access allowances, can alter the information provided.

In a logical extension to this internet protocols example, a server would receive from the client, either manually or automatically, a full context which would be information about the situation the client is in and this would allow the server to best interpret the client's request. Current internet protocols allow for formats, languages and related preferences to be expressed by clients but make no mention of what a client already knows and what they may understand. The recent Content Negotiation by Profile proposes additions to both the HTTP internet protocols and related services that allow clients to also request information - a response from the server - that accords with an identified information model. This then allows clients to indicate not just formats and languages that they understand (technically that they prefer) but also domains of discourse that that do, which is a step towards comprehensive client context provision.

== See also ==
- as a service
