= IT as a service =

Business model for providing information technology

IT as a service (ITaaS) is an operational model where the information technology (IT) service provider delivers an information technology service to a business. The IT service provider can be an internal IT organization or an external IT services company. The recipients of ITaaS can be a line of business (LOB) organization within an enterprise or a small and medium business (SMB). The information technology is typically delivered as a managed service with a clear IT services catalog and pricing associated with each of the catalog items. At its core, ITaaS is a competitive business model where businesses have many options for IT services and the internal IT organization has to compete against those other external options in order to be the selected IT service provider to the business. Options for providers other than the internal IT organization may include IT outsourcing companies and public cloud providers.

Under an ITaaS model, the IT service provider will place great emphasis on the needs and the outcomes required by the business to improve employee productivity and improving the top line (revenue) and bottom line (profitability). Such services will have a deep industry focus to fully enable industry specific use cases. The benefits to the business sought by using the ITaaS model include the standardization and simplification of products delivered by IT, improved financial transparency and more direct association of costs to consumption, and increased IT operational efficiency resulting from the need to compare the price of internally produced products to those available from external providers. The transformation of an internal IT organization from operating as a cost-center to an ITaaS model is also believed to produce improved levels of business agility for the enterprise as a whole.

== Not a cloud service model ==
According to The NIST Definition of Cloud Computing, there are three service models associated with cloud computing: infrastructure as a service (IaaS), platform as a service (PaaS), and software as a service (SaaS). The concept of ITaaS as an operating model is not limited to or dependent on cloud computing. Several proponents of ITaaS as an operating model will insist that the ability for an IT organization to deliver ITaaS is enabled by underlying technology models such as IaaS, PaaS, and SaaS. Vendors who are proponents of the concept of ITaaS as an operating model include EMC, Citrix, and VMware.

ITaaS is not a technology shift - such as a move to increase the use of virtualization. Rather, it is an operational and organizational shift to running IT like a business and optimizing IT production for business consumption. IT organizations that adopt ITaaS are most likely to use the best practices for IT service management as defined in ITIL.

== Transformation to IT as a service ==
Several vendors who are proponents of ITaaS describe the transition of an IT organization to the ITaaS model as a journey which includes the adoption of such models as:

- New technology models founded on the use of private, public, and hybrid clouds; employing controls, trust and compliance up and down the stack; introducing infrastructure standardization and automation wherever possible.
- New consumption models leveraging self-service catalogs offering both internal and external services; providing IT financial transparency for costs and pricing; offering consumerized IT – such as bring your own device (BYoD) – to meet the needs of users. All of which simplify and encourage consumption of services.
- New operational models which imply a revised organization, with new business and technical skills and roles; creation of more horizontal, service-oriented processes; explicit IT alignment with lines-of-business.
- Business driven IT solution is represented as a repeatable business activity having a specified outcome, wherein service acts as a self-contained logical unit, may be composed of other services (choreography), is generally a "black box" to typical consumers while highly transparent to leadership.
- Can include services such as fractional CIO for the business, whereby fiduciary duty is to the client.

== See also ==
- Desktop outsourcing
- as a service
