= As a service =

"x as a service" (rendered as *aaS in acronyms) is a phrasal template for any business model in which a product use is offered as a subscription-based service rather than as an artifact owned and maintained by the customer. The converse of conducting or operating something "as a service" is doing the same using "on-premise" assets (such as on-premises software) or lump sum investments. Originating from the software-as-a-service concept that appeared in the 2010s with the advent of cloud computing, the template has expanded to numerous offerings in the field of information technology and beyond it. The term XaaS can mean "anything as a service". (Note: sometimes called EaaS or "Everything as a Service")

The following is an alphabetical list of business models named in this way, including certain forms of cybercrime (criminal business models).

== B ==
=== Backend as a service (BaaS) ===
Backend as a service (BaaS), sometimes also referred to as mobile backend as a service (MBaaS), is a service for providing web app and mobile app developers with a way to easily build a backend to their frontend applications. Features available include user management, push notifications, and integration with social networking services. These services are provided via the use of custom software development kits (SDKs) and application programming interfaces (APIs). BaaS is a relatively recent development in cloud computing, with most BaaS startups dating from 2011 or later. Some of the most popular service providers are AWS Amplify and Firebase.

=== Banking as a service (BaaS) Market ===
Banking as a service (BaaS) is the provision of banking products (such as deposit accounts, loans and credit cards) to customers through non-bank or non-financial third party partnerships. The bank provides the balance sheet management, including capital, liquidity and credit risk management, while the partner company (typically a fintech) interacts directly with the customer via their proprietary app, often accessing the bank's systems and data via APIs.

=== Blockchain as a service (BaaS) ===
Blockchain as a service (BaaS) is an enterprise-level software service that allows businesses to use cloud-based integration solutions to build, host and use their own blockchain apps, smart contracts and functions on the blockchain infrastructure developed by a vendor. Just like the growing trend of using software as a service (SaaS) where access to the software is provided on a subscription basis, BaaS provides a business with access to a blockchain network of its desired configuration without the business having to develop their own blockchain and build in-house expertise on the subject.

== C ==
=== Content as a service (CaaS) ===
Content as a service (CaaS) or managed content as a service (MCaaS) is a service-oriented model, where the service provider delivers the content on demand to the service consumer via web services that are licensed under subscription. The content is hosted by the service provider centrally in the cloud and offered to a number of consumers that need the content delivered into any applications or system, hence content can be demanded by the consumers as and when required.

== D ==
=== Data as a service (DaaS) ===
Data as a service (DaaS) is a cloud-based software tool used for working with data, such as managing data in a data warehouse or analyzing data with business intelligence. It is enabled by software as a service (SaaS). Like all "as a service" (aaS) technology, DaaS builds on the concept that its data product can be provided to the user on demand, regardless of geographic or organizational separation between provider and consumer. Service-oriented architecture (SOA) and the widespread use of APIs have rendered the platform on which the data resides as irrelevant.

=== Database as a service (DBaaS) ===
With a database as a service model (DBaaS), users pay fees to a cloud provider for services and computing resources, reducing the amount of money and effort needed to develop and manage databases. Users are given tools to create and manage database instances, and control users. Some cloud providers also offer tools to manage database structures and data. Many cloud providers offer both relational (Amazon RDS, SQL Server) and NoSQL (MongoDB, Amazon DynamoDB) databases. This is a type of software as a service (SaaS).

=== Data management as a service (DMaaS) ===
Data management can also be done through the "as a service" business model, according to the book Data Management as a Service for Dummies.

=== DDoS as a service (DDoSaaS) ===
DDoS-as-a-Service (DDoSaaS) is a cybercrime model in which individuals can hire hackers to execute an distributed denial-of-service (DDoS) attack against a specified target for a fee, typically paid in cryptocurrency, making such attacks more accessible to those without technical expertise.

=== Desktop as a service (DaaS) ===
Remote desktop virtualization can also be provided via cloud computing similar to that provided using a software as a service model. This approach is usually referred to as cloud-hosted virtual desktops. Cloud-hosted virtual desktops are divided into two technologies:

1. Managed VDI, which is based on VDI technology provided as an outsourced managed service, and
2. Desktop as a service (DaaS), which provides a higher level of automation and real multi-tenancy, reducing the cost of the technology. The DaaS provider typically takes full responsibility for hosting and maintaining the computer, storage, and access infrastructure, as well as applications and application software licenses needed to provide the desktop service in return for a fixed monthly fee.

== E ==
=== Energy storage as a service (ESaaS) ===
Energy storage as a service (ESaaS) allows a facility to benefit from the advantages of an energy storage system by entering into a service agreement without purchasing the system. Energy storage systems provide a range of services to generate revenue, create savings, and improve electricity resiliency. The operation of the ESaaS system is a unique combination of an advanced battery storage system, an energy management system, and a service contract which can deliver value to a business by providing reliable power more economically.

=== Exploit as a service (EaaS) ===
Exploit as a service (EaaS) is a scheme of cybercriminals whereby zero-day vulnerabilities are leased to hackers. EaaS is typically offered as a cloud service. By the end of 2021, EaaS became more of a trend among ransomware groups.

=== Other "EaaS" business models ===
Under the acronym EaaS, the following business models have been discussed in journals and conferences:

- Edge as a service
- Encryption as a service
- Energy as a service
- Evaluation as a service

== F ==
=== Function as a service (FaaS) ===
Function as a service is a "platform-level cloud capability" that enables its users "to build and manage microservices applications with low initial investment for scalability," according to ISO/IEC 22123-2.

== G ==
=== Games as a service (GaaS) ===
In the video game industry, a live service game (also referred to as games as a service, abbreviated to GaaS) represents providing video games or game content on a continuing revenue model, similar to software as a service. Live service games are ways to monetize video games either after their initial sale, or to support a free-to-play model. Games released under the live service model are designed to receive a long or indefinite stream of monetized new content over time to encourage players to continue paying to support the game. This often leads to games that work under a live service model to be called "living games" or "live games" since they continually change with these updates.

=== Ground segment as a service (GSaaS) ===
GSaaS means outsourcing ground operations to a third-party provider by the satellite operators.

== I ==
=== Infrastructure as a service (IaaS) ===
Infrastructure as a service (IaaS) is a cloud computing service model where a cloud services vendor provides computing resources such as storage, network, servers, and virtualization (which emulates computer hardware). This service frees users from maintaining their own data center, but they must install and maintain the operating system and application software. IaaS provides users with high-level APIs to control details of the underlying network infrastructure, such as backup, data partitioning, scaling, security, and physical computing resources. Services can be scaled on-demand by the user. According to the Internet Engineering Task Force (IETF), such infrastructure is the most basic cloud-service model. IaaS can be hosted in a public cloud (where users share hardware, storage, and network devices), a private cloud (users do not share resources), or a hybrid cloud (combination of both).

=== Integration platform as a service (IPaaS) ===
Integration platform as a service (iPaaS) is a suite of cloud services enabling customers to develop, execute and govern integration flows between disparate applications. Under the cloud-based iPaaS integration model, customers drive the development and deployment of integrations without installing or managing any hardware or middleware. The iPaaS model allows businesses to achieve integration without big investment into skills or licensed middleware software. iPaaS used to be regarded primarily as an integration tool for cloud-based software applications, used mainly by small to mid-sized business. Over time, a hybrid type of iPaaS—hybrid-IT iPaaS—that connects cloud to on-premises, is becoming increasingly popular. Additionally, large enterprises are exploring new ways of integrating iPaaS into their existing IT infrastructures.

=== IT as a service (ITaaS) ===
IT as a service (ITaaS) is an operational model where the information technology (IT) service provider delivers an information technology service to a business. The IT service provider can be an internal IT organization or an external IT services company. The recipients of ITaaS can be a line of business (LOB) organization within an enterprise or a small and medium business (SMB). The information technology is typically delivered as a managed service with a clear IT services catalog and pricing associated with each of the catalog items. At its core, ITaaS is a competitive business model where businesses have many options for IT services and the internal IT organization has to compete against those other external options in order to be the selected IT service provider to the business. Options for providers other than the internal IT organization may include IT outsourcing companies and public cloud providers.

== K ==
=== Knowledge as a service (KaaS) ===
Knowledge as a service (KaaS) is a computing service that delivers information to users, backed by a knowledge model, which might be drawn from a number of possible models based on decision trees, association rules, or neural networks. A knowledge as a service provider responds to knowledge requests from users through a centralised knowledge server, and provides an interface between users and data owners.

== L ==
=== Logging as a service (LaaS) ===
Logging as a service (LaaS) is an IT architectural model for centrally ingesting and collecting any type of log files coming from any given source or location such as servers, applications, devices etc. The files are "normalized" or filtered for reformatting and forwarding to other dependent systems to be processed as “native” data, which can then be managed, displayed and ultimately disposed of according to a predesignated retention schedule based on any number of criteria.

=== Lighting as a service (LaaS) ===
Lighting as a service (LaaS), also known as light as a service, is a service-based business model in which lighting service is charged on a subscription basis rather than via a one-time payment. It is managed by specialized service providers and may include light design, financing, installation, maintenance and other services. The model involves outsourcing of lighting aspects of a business over a period of time.

== M ==
=== Mobility as a service (MaaS) ===
Mobility as a service (MaaS) is a type of service that enables users to plan, book, and pay for multiple types of mobility services through an integrated platform. Transportation services from public and private transportation providers are combined through a unified gateway, usually via an app or website, that creates and manages the trip and payments, including subscriptions, with a single account. The key concept behind MaaS is to offer travelers flexible mobility solutions based on their travel needs, thus "mobility as a service" also refers to the broader concept of a shift away from personally-owned modes of transportation and towards mobility provided as a service.

=== Monitoring as a service (MaaS) ===
Monitoring as a service (MaaS) is a cloud-based framework for the deployment of monitoring functionalities for various other services and applications within the cloud. The most common application for MaaS is online state monitoring, which continuously tracks certain states of applications, networks, systems, instances or any element that may be deployable within the cloud.

== N ==
=== Network as a service (NaaS) ===
Network as a service (NaaS) is a term used to describe the provision of computer networking technology to an organisation as an integrated service. It is related to terms like infrastructure as a service (IaaS), platform as a service (PaaS), software as a service (SaaS), and software-defined networking (SDN).

== O ==
=== Offshoring as a service (OaaS) ===
Subcontracting in the same country would be outsourcing, but not offshoring. A company moving an internal business unit from one country to another would be offshoring or physical restructuring, but not outsourcing. A company subcontracting a business unit to a different company in another country would be both outsourcing and offshoring, offshore outsourcing. Offshoring as a service (OaaS) is a business model in which the offshore office is outsourcing to a vendor. The OaaS model leans towards utilizing a team or company which specializes in offshoring work and uses them on a contractual basis as a part of their own team.

== P ==
=== Payments as a service (PaaS) ===
Payments as a service (PaaS) is a marketing phrase used to describe software as a service to connect a group of international payment systems. The architecture is represented by a layer – or overlay – that resides on top of these disparate systems and provides for two-way communications between the payment system and the PaaS. Communication is governed by standard APIs created by the PaaS provider.

=== Phishing as a service (PaaS) ===
Phishing as a service allows cybercriminals with little technical skills or without resources to launch sophisticated phishing attacks by providing access to a phishing kit.

=== Platform as a service (PaaS) ===
Platform as a service (PaaS) or application platform as a service (aPaaS) or platform-based service is a cloud computing service model where users provision, instantiate, run and manage a modular bundle of a computing platform and applications, without the complexity of building and maintaining the infrastructure associated with developing and launching application(s), and to allow developers to create, develop, and package such software bundles.

== R ==
=== Ransomware as a service (RaaS) ===
Ransomware as a service (RaaS) is a cybercrime business model, allowing ransomware developers to write and sell harmful code or malware to other hackers, often known as affiliates, for their own initiation of ransomware attacks through the use of their software. Affiliates typically do not need to have any technical skills of their own but can solely rely on the technical skills of their operators. They provide attackers with easier entry for those who may not have skills to develop their own tools, but rather be able to utilize and manage ready-made tools to perform attacks. Most of the time they involve some type of arrangement between the affiliate and the operator, making successful ransomware and extortion attacks profitable for both parties.

=== Recovery as a service (RaaS) ===
Recovery as a service (RaaS), sometimes referred to as disaster recovery as a service (DRaaS), is a category of cloud computing used for protecting an application or data from a natural or human disaster or service disruption at one location by enabling a full recovery in the cloud. RaaS differs from cloud-based backup services by protecting data and providing standby computing capacity on demand to facilitate more rapid application recovery. RaaS capacity is delivered in a cloud-computing model so recovery resources are only paid for when they are used, making it more efficient than a traditional disaster recovery warm site or hot site where the recovery resources must be running at all times.

=== Robot as a service (RaaS) ===
Robot as a service or robotics as a service (RaaS) is a cloud computing unit that facilitates the seamless integration of robots and embedded devices into Web and cloud computing environments. In terms of service-oriented architecture (SOA), a RaaS unit includes services for performing functionality, a service directory for discovery and publishing, and service clients for user's direct access. The current RaaS implementation facilitates SOAP and RESTful communications between RaaS units and the other cloud computing units. Hardware support and standards are available to support RaaS implementation. Devices Profile for Web Services (DPWS) defines implementation constraints to enable secure web service messaging, discovery, description, and eventing on resource-constrained devices between web services and devices.

== S ==
=== Security as a service (SECaaS) ===
Security as a service (SECaaS) is a business model in which a service provider integrates their security services into a corporate infrastructure on a subscription basis more cost-effectively than most individuals or corporations can provide on their own when the total cost of ownership is considered. SECaaS is inspired by the "software as a service" model as applied to information security type services and does not require on-premises hardware, avoiding substantial capital outlays. These security services often include authentication, anti-virus, anti-malware/spyware, intrusion detection, Penetration testing, and security event management, among others.

=== Software as a service (SaaS) ===
Software as a service (SaaS /sæs/) is a cloud computing service model in which a provider delivers application software to clients while managing the required physical and software resources. SaaS applications are accessed via either a web application or locally-installed software. Unlike other software delivery models, SaaS separates "the possession and ownership of software from its use". The use of SaaS began around 2000, and by 2023 was the main form of software application deployment.

== T ==
=== Transportation as a Service ===
Transportation as a Service (TaaS) is a transportation system where customers have use of a vehicle over just the time they need it and use of the vehicle may also be shared with other customers.

== W ==
=== Workspace as a Service ===
Workspace as a Service (WaaS) is a desktop virtualization utilised by companies to offer to employees a complete computer environment with remote access.

== See also ==
- Cloud computing § Service models
- "Windows as a service", Microsoft's attempt to apply the SaaS model to their operating system

== Sources ==
- Dempsey, David; Kelliher, Felicity (2018). Industry Trends in Cloud Computing: Alternative Business-to-Business Revenue Models. Springer International Publishing. ISBN 978-3-319-87693-1.
- Golding, Tod (2024). Building Multi-Tenant SaaS Architectures. O'Reilly Media. ISBN 978-1-0981-4061-8.
