= Alfheim (disambiguation) =

Alfheim or Alvheim is an old Norse place-name. It may refer to:

== Places ==
- Álfheimr, home of the elves in Norse mythology
- Álfheimr (region), a historical region
- Alfheim Mountain Cabin, a cabin in Sunndal Municipality, Norway
- Alfheim stadion, a football stadium in Tromsø, Norway
- Alfheimbjerg, Greenland

Alfheim is also the name of individual areas within several Norwegian municipalities. An area named Alfheim may be found in:

- Asker Municipality
- Grue Municipality
- Halden Municipality
- Lier Municipality
- Tromsø Municipality

== People ==
Alfheim or Alvheim is a Norwegian surname:

- Frode Alfheim
- Kristin Alfheim (born 1971), Wisconsin politician
- John Alvheim
