= CAAS =

CAAS or CaaS is an acronym for the following:

- Civil Aviation Authority of Singapore
- Chinese Academy of Agricultural Sciences
- Coalition for Access, Affordability, and Success, former name of the Coalition for College
- Content as a service (CaaS)
- Crimeware as a service (CaaS)
- Culinary Arts Academy Switzerland
