= Ifield =

Ifield can refer to:

- Frank Ifield (1937–2024), country music singer
- Ifield, West Sussex, England
- Singlewell or Ifield, part of the town of Gravesend, Kent
- Intelligent Fields, also known as Integrated operations
