= Norwegian Union of Wood Industry Workers =

Norwegian trade union

Logo of the union

The Norwegian Union of Wood Industry Workers (Norwegian: Norsk Treindustriarbeiderforbund, NTAF) was a trade union representing woodworkers in Norway.

The union was founded on 6 February 1904, as the Norwegian Union of Furniture Makers, a split from the Wood Workers' Union of Norway. It affiliated to the Norwegian Confederation of Trade Unions. Over time, it came to represent wood workers in other areas, such as the manufacture of skis and brushes. By 1963, the union had 5,743 members.

In 2009, the union merged into Industri Energi.
