= Frode Alfheim =

Norwegian trade unionist

- Born: 25 July 1967 (age 58); Dønna Municipality
- Occupation: Trade unionist

Frode Alfheim (born 25 July 1967 in Dønna Municipality) is a Norwegian trade unionist and president of the Norwegian trade union Forbundet Styrke from 2017.

He was the deputy chairman of its predecessor Norwegian Oil and Petrochemical Union (NOPEF) from 2004 to 2006, union-political area head for Industri Energi between 2006 and 2010, and deputy chairman of Industri Energi from 2010 to 2017. Alfheim has been professionally active since 1986.

In 2018, Frode Alfheim was elected as leader of the world's oil and energy workers during IndustriALL Global's energy section's world conference in St. Petersburg on July 25 and 26.

Alfheim is chairman of the committee that decides who will receive the annual Arthur Svensson International Prize for professional rights.

Trade union offices
Preceded by Leif Sande	President of Industri Energi; 2017–	Incumbent
