= Integrated operations =

Collaboration with focus on production in the petroleum industry

In the petroleum industry, Integrated operations (IO) refers to the integration of people, disciplines, organizations, work processes and information and communication technology to make smarter decisions. In short, IO is collaboration with focus on production.

== Contents of the term ==
The most striking part of IO has been the use of always-on videoconference rooms between offshore platforms and land-based offices. This includes broadband connections for sharing of data and video-surveillance of the platform. This has made it possible to move some personnel onshore and use the existing human resources more efficiently. Instead of having e.g. an expert in geology on duty at every platform, the expert may be stationed on land and be available for consultation for several offshore platforms. It is also possible for a team at an office in a different time zone to be consulting the night-shift of the platform, so that no land-based workers need work at night.

Splitting the team between land and sea demands new work processes, which together with ICT is the two main focus points for IO. Tools like videoconferencing and 3D-visualization also creates an opportunity for new, more cross-discipline cooperations. For instance, a shared 3D-visualization may be tailored to each member of the group, so that the geologist gets a visualization of the geological structures while the drilling engineer focuses on visualizing the well. Here, real-time measurements from the well are important but the downhole bandwidth has previously been very restricted. Improvements in bandwidth, better measurement devices, better aggregation and visualization of this information and improved models that simulate the rock formations and wellbore currently all feed on each other. An important task where all these improvements play together is real-time production optimization.

In the process industry in general, the term is used to describe the increased cooperation, independent of location, between operators, maintenance personnel, electricians, production management as well as business management and suppliers to provide a more streamlined plant operation.

By deploying IO, the petroleum industry draws on lessons from the process industry. This can be seen in a larger focus on the whole production chain and management ideas imported from the production and process industry. A prominent idea in this regard is real-time optimization of the whole value chain, from long term management of the oil reservoir, through capacity allocations in pipe networks and calculations of the net present value of the produced oil. Reviews of the application of Integrated Operations can be found in papers presented in the by-annual society of petroleum engineers Intelligent Energy conferences.

A focus on the whole production chain is also seen in debates about how to organize people in an IO organisation, with frequent calls for breaking down the Information silos in the oil companies. A large oil company is typically organized in functional silos corresponding to disciplines such as drilling, production and reservoir management. This is regarded as inefficient by the IO movement, pointing out that the activities in any well or field by any of the silos will involve or affect all of the others. While some companies focus on their inhouse management structure, others also emphasize the integration and coordination of outside suppliers and collaborators in offshore-operations. For instance, it is pointed out that the oil and gas industry is lagging behind other industries in terms of Operational intelligence.

Ideas and theories that IO management and work processes build on will be familiar from operations research, knowledge management and continual improvement as well as information systems and business transformation. This is perhaps most evident in the repeated referral to "people, process and technology" in IO discussions . As bullet-points this mirror many of the aforementioned fields.

Since 2010 major mining companies have become implementers of Integrated Operations, most notable Rio Tinto, BHP Biliton and Codelco.

== Incentives ==
Common to most companies is that IO leads to cost savings as fewer people are stationed offshore and an increased efficiency. Lower costs, more efficient reservoir management and fewer mistakes during well drilling will in turn raise profits and make more oil fields economically viable. IO comes at a time when the oil industry is faced with more "brown fields", also referred to as "tail production", where the cost of extracting the oil will be higher than its market value, unless major improvements in technology and work processes are made. It has been estimated that deployment of IO could produce 300 billion NOK of added value to the Norwegian continental shelf alone. On a longer time-scale, working onshore control and monitoring of the oil production may become a necessity as new fields at deeper waters are based purely on unmanned sub-sea facilities.

Moving jobs onshore has also been touted as a way to keep and make better use of an aging workforce, which is regarded as a challenge by western oil and gas companies. As the average age of the industry workforce is increasing with many nearing retirement, IO is being leveraged for knowledge sharing and training of younger workforce. More comfortable onshore jobs together with "high-tech" tools has also been fronted as a way to recruit young workers into an industry that is seen as "unsexy", "lowtech" and difficult to combine with a normal family life.

== Critique ==
The security aspect of reducing the offshore workforce has been raised. Will on-site experience be lost and can familiarity with the platform and its processes be attained from an onshore office? The new working environment in any case demands changes to HSE routines. Some of the challenges also include clear role and responsibility definitions and clarifications between the onshore & offshore personnel. Who in a given situation has the authority to take decisions, the onsite or the offshore staff. The increased integration of the offshore facilities with the onshore office environment and outside collaborators also expose work-critical ICT-infrastructure to the internet and the hazards of everyday ICT. As for the efficiency aspect, some criticize the onshore-offshore collaboration for creating a more bureaucratic working environment.

== Naming conventions ==
Both the exact terms and the content used to describe IO vary between companies. The oil company Shell has traditionally branded the term Smart Fields, which was an extension of Smart Wells that only referred to remote-controlled well-valves. BP uses Field of the future to refer to its innovations in oil production. Chevron has i-field, Honeywell has Digital Suites for Oil and Gas (a set of software and services), and Schlumberger terms it Digital Energy. The latter term, understood as referring to oil and gas, is adopted in the title of the digital energy journal. This term could have several meanings, as GE Digital Energy for instance, do not appear to use it in the IO sense.

Other terms include e-Field, i-Field, Digital Oilfield, Intelligent Oilfield, Field of the future and Intelligent Energy. Integrated operations has been the preferred term by Statoil, the Norwegian Oil Industry Association (OLF), a professional body and employer's association for oil and supplier companies and vendors such as ABB. IO is also the preferred term for Petrobras. Intelligent Energy is the dominant term in publications revolving around the biannual SPE Intelligent Energy conference, which has been one of the major conferences for the IO movement, along with the annual IO Science and Practice conference which obviously supports the IO term.

== See also ==
- Integrated asset modelling a holistic modelling approach in oil and gas, connecting models across disciplines
- "Leading Consultancy on Digital Transformation & Integrated Operations". stepchangeglobal.com.
- Integrated Operations in the High North, a collaboration project working on the next or second generation of Integrated Operations.
- ISO 15926, an enabler for the next or second generation of Integrated Operations by integrating data across disciplines and business domains.
- WITSML an example of a standardisation effort for real-time drilling data which facilitate integration of disparate computer systems
- Definition of IO by Global IO
