= History of Statoil (1972–2007) =

Statoil ASA
- Formerly: Den Norske Stats Oljeselskap A/S (1972–2001)
- Industry: Oil and gas
- Founded: 14 July 1972; 54 years ago
- Defunct: 1 October 2007
- Fate: merged with Norsk Hydro division, and later renamed
- Successor: Equinor
- Headquarters: Stavanger, Norway
- Products: Oil; Natural gas Petrochemicals

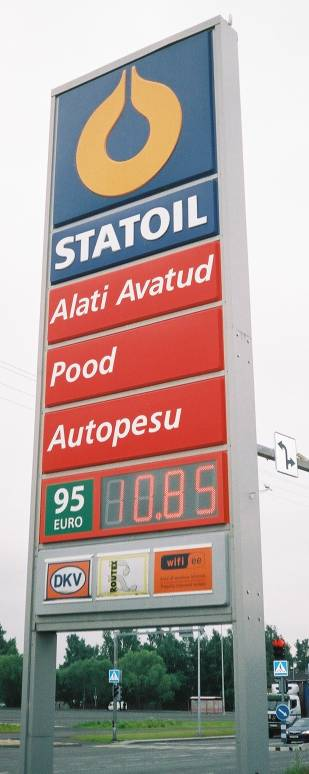
A Statoil petrol station sign in Estonia

Statoil ASA was a Norwegian petroleum company established in 1972. It merged with the oil and gas division of Norsk Hydro in 2007 and was known as StatoilHydro until 2009, when the name was changed back to Statoil ASA. The brand Statoil was retained as a chain of fuel stations owned by StatoilHydro. Statoil was the largest petroleum company in the Nordic countries. In the 2013 Fortune 500, Statoil was ranked as the 39th -largest company in the world. While Statoil was listed on both the Oslo Stock Exchange and the New York Stock Exchange, the Norwegian state still held majority ownership, with 64%. The company's headquarters are located in Norway's oil capital Stavanger. The name Statoil was a truncated form of the State's oil (company).

Statoil was one of the largest net sellers of crude oil in the world, and a major supplier of natural gas to the European continent, Statoil also operated around 2000 service stations in 9 countries. The company's CEO from mid-2004 onwards was Helge Lund, formerly CEO of Aker Kværner.

== History ==
=== Early years ===
Den Norske Stats Oljeselskap A/S (Norwegian State Oil Company) was founded as a private limited company owned by the Government of Norway on 14 July 1972 by a unanimous act passed by the Storting, the Norwegian parliament. The political motivation was Norwegian participation in the oil industry on the continental shelf and to build up Norwegian competency within the petroleum industry to establish the foundations of a domestic petroleum industry. Statoil was required to discuss important issues with the Minister of Industry, later Minister of Petroleum and Energy. Statoil was also required to submit an annual report to the parliament.

In 1973, the company started work acquiring a presence in the petrochemical industry. This resulted in the development of processing plants in Rafsnes and, in partnership with Norsk Hydro, the Mongstad plant in 1980. In 1981 the company acquired, as the first Norwegian company, operator rights on the Norwegian continental shelf on the Gullfaks field. 1987–88 saw the largest scandal in the companies history, the Mongstad scandal that made the until then unassailable CEO Arve Johnsen withdraw. In 1990, Statoil was one of several oil companies operating in the North Sea to be affected by a labor strike, which involved about 4,000 workers in total.

=== Privatization ===
The company was privatised and made a public limited company (allmennaksjeselskap) in 2001, becoming listed on both the Oslo Stock Exchange and the New York Stock Exchange. At the same time it changed its name to Statoil ASA.

=== Merger with Hydro ===
In December 2006 Statoil revealed a proposal to merge with the oil business of Norsk Hydro, a Norwegian conglomerate. Under the rules of the EEA the proposal was approved by the European Union on 3 May 2007 and by the Norwegian Parliament on 8 June 2007. Former Statoil's shareholders hold 67.3% of the new company StatoilHydro, which started operations on 1 October 2007. The company is the biggest offshore oil and gas company in the world.

In November 2009, StatoilHydro changed its name to simply Statoil, following a prolonged name debate that sparked considerable public interest.

== Environmental record ==
Statoil had three oil spills in Arctic waters near Norway. All the spills occurred from its ocean rig called the Erik Raude. The company was searching for oil in the region, which environmentalists were against because they wanted the sensitive area free from pollution. However, the Norwegian government allowed oil exploration, as long as there were no emissions. After the merger to StatoilHydro, in December 2007, 25,000 barrels (4,000 m^{3}) of oil leaked into the North Sea. This was Statoil's 2nd worst oil spill. Two leaks also occurred in February 2008. In March, Statoil dropped about 1.6 tons of pure hydraulic oil in the Barents Sea. Hydraulic oil is said to be the 2nd most hazardous pollutant. Since the leaks, Statoil has stated that the oil has mostly dissolved, and there is not much proof of ecological harm. The Norwegian government has not stopped the oil drilling in the Arctic waters, and Statoil started up its oil operations in April 2005. Bellona, a Norwegian environmental group, is looking to take legal action. They want the end of oil drilling in the Barents Sea.

== Controversy and corruption ==
=== Rotvoll controversy ===
In 1991 there arose a controversy between Statoil and local environmentalists, mainly from Natur og Ungdom and Friends of the Earth Norway, who protested the building of a new research and development centre at Rotvoll in Trondheim, Norway, wetlands area close to the city with significant bird life. The controversy was climaxed with civil disobedience by the environmentalists, but the centre was still built.

=== Statoil corruption case ===
The Statoil corruption case refers to the company's misconduct and use of corruption in Iran in 2002/2003 in an attempt to secure lucrative oil contracts in that country. This was mainly achieved by hiring the services of Horton Investments, an Iranian consultancy firm owned by Mehdi Hashemi Rafsanjani, son of former Iranian President Hashemi Rafsanjani. Horton Investments was paid US$15.2 million by Statoil to influence important political figures in Iran to grant oil contracts to Statoil. The corruption scandal was uncovered by Norwegian paper Dagens Næringsliv on 3 September 2003.
