= Enigma Technologies =

American data-technology startup

Enigma Technologies, Inc.
- Type: Private
- Industry: Data as a service Open data Internet; Technology; Financial services
- Founded: 2012; 14 years ago
- Founder: Hicham Oudghiri
- Headquarters: New York, New York, US
- Key people: Marc DaCosta: chairman, co-founder Hicham Oudghiri: CEO, co-founder Scott Sandel: board member, NEA; Ben Narasin: board member Andrew Cleland: board member, Comcast Ventures
- Number of employees: 145
- Website: enigma.com

Enigma Technologies, Inc., is a data science and AI company headquartered in New York City that specializes in providing data and intelligence about businesses. The company is mainly known for Enigma Public, a now defunct library of public data.

Using machine learning and artificial intelligence, the company organizes and connects hundreds of sources to provide data about businesses for customers in a variety of use cases, from financial services compliance to B2B marketing and insurance underwriting and lending. Enigma works with a number of Fortune 500 companies, including American Express, ADP, BB&T, Celgene, Merck, and PayPal.

== History ==
Enigma Technologies, Inc. was founded by Marc DaCosta (Chairman, co-founder) and Hicham Oudghiri (CEO, co-founder). Their first investor was Aelfie Oudghiri, who maxed out her credit card purchasing their initial server. The founders' curiosity was drawn into focus by the 2008 financial crisis. They were frustrated that relevant public data was available, and should have shed light on these two occurrences, but the world still struggled to connect the dots to understand how and why these crises happened or to stop both altogether. They sought to make data connected, open, and actionable – and Enigma was born. The company currently has more than 100 employees and is headquartered in NYC's Silicon Alley.

Enigma was launched at the three-day 2013 TechCrunch Disrupt Conference, and was the winner of the event's Startup Battlefield. In February 2013 they announced a $1.1 million seed funding round backed by TriplePoint Capital and Crosslink Capital, among others. This was augmented in early 2014 by a $4.5 million funding round which included additional investors The New York Times Company, Comcast Ventures, and American Express Ventures.

In June 2013, the company announced a long-term beta testing partnership with Stanford University and Harvard University, granting full access to their students and academic communities. In October 2013, the company was a finalist in the NYCEDC-sponsored "Take the HELM: Hire + Expand in Lower Manhattan" contest, and in June 2014 they were selected as participants in the FinTech Innovation Lab program.

In August 2014, Enigma announced that Jeremy Bronfman would step down as CEO and be replaced by Hicham Oudghiri.

In June 2015, Enigma secured a $28.2 million Series B funding round led by New Enterprise Associates (NEA) with participation from Two Sigma Ventures and New York City Investment Fund, as well as existing investors including American Express Ventures, Comcast Ventures and The New York Times Company.

In April 2017, Enigma moved its website to Enigma.com from its previous site, Enigma.io, and ceased referring to itself with the ".io" qualifier.

Enigma was named to Forbes FinTech 50 List in February 2018.

In September 2018, Enigma announced $95 million in new funds to expand its network and platform that connects real-world and enterprise data to power key workflows. Existing investor NEA led this funding, which included new investments from strategic FinTech investors BB&T, Capital One Growth Ventures, MetLife and Third Point along with venture firm Glynn Capital. Early investors Comcast Ventures, Crosslink Capital, Two Sigma Ventures, and the Partnership Fund for NYC also participated. This was the inaugural investment for both BB&T and MetLife.

== Enigma Public ==
Enigma Public was a data warehouse website which provided an aggregated collection of public data from international government agencies, organizations, and businesses. It was at one point the broadest collection of public data that is open and searchable by everyone, and could be accessed through Enigma's web-based user interface, which also provided a collection of data analytics tools. Users could register for a free rate-limited account to receive programmatic access via their web API, while unfettered or commercial access was available for a fee.

Data republished by Enigma was reusable (with attribution) for free by journalists, so it was occasionally used as a primary or corroborating source for analyses on everything from FBI aerial surveillance to house fire incidents to U.S. government shipping records.

The company redesigned and updated Enigma Public in June 2017 in an effort to make public data more accessible and easy to use. This redesign included features that enabled users to identity connections and interpretations within the data quickly and easily by focusing metadata and linked datasets. The updated platform also curated featured datasets and collections, including those obtained by Freedom of Information Act requests.

In August 2018, Enigma released a Python SDK for Enigma Public, designed to make it easier to locate and import public data into a Jupyter notebook or any other Python project using the Enigma Public API.

Enigma Public was deactivated on March 24, 2020.

== Enigma Labs ==
Enigma has built a number of open data tools that serve a public good, called Enigma Labs. Each project sheds light on critical topics of the day and enables and informs civic action.

The company's first Lab was launched in October 2013, as a real-time visualization tracking how the United States federal government shutdown of 2013 impacted employees of every government agency.

In 2014, Enigma partnered with the City of New Orleans to better identify which neighborhoods were least likely to have smoke alarms. This project, called Smoke Signals, was soon scaled to cities across the United States in partnership with DataKind and the American Red Cross. The tool uses data from the American Housing Survey and American Community Survey to create a block-level assessment of whether residents are likely to have a working smoke alarm in more than 175 cities in the United States and is available as an interactive map and downloadable CSV files. Cities can also upload their own historical fire incident data to improve the model for their area.

== Data ==
Enigma combines hundreds of public and private sources of data, including government agencies, organizations, and websites, into a single database. Enigma has obtained a vast amount of data via Freedom of Information Act (FOIA) requests, including New York Metropolitan Transit Authority accident reports and a log of all FOIA requests made to the Securities and Exchange Commission. Enigma provides free basic firmographic data about millions of U.S. businesses via its API.

== Features ==
Enigma provides access to its data through a web-based graphical user interface and an API. Tools are provided in the interface for performing basic statistical analysis, such as finding the minimum, maximum or mean value of any numerical data column. For further analysis, users may either use the interface to export data to a CSV file or make HTTP requests to the provided API. The company also produces interactive data visualizations which provide visual interfaces for particular individual datasets.

On May 11, 2016, Enigma announced the launch of ParseKit, now called "Concourse", their proprietary software for ETL and data integration, which had been developed internally via dogfooding to acquire their public datasets.

In September 2018, Enigma announced its use of knowledge graphs as the vehicle for ingesting, standardizing, and adapting data from tables into representations of relationships delivered to users. Enigma uses linking, ontology mapping, and entity resolution capabilities to uncover new information about businesses and to deliver linked information through an API. Enigma's knowledge graphs integrate machine learning of Elasticsearch results, to improve entity resolution.
