= Wellsite Information Transfer Specification =

The Wellsite Information Transfer Specification (WITS) is a specification for the transfer of drilling rig-related data. This petroleum industry standard is recognized by a number of companies internationally and is supported by many hardware devices and software applications.

WITS is a multi-layered specification:

- Layer 0 describes an ASCII-based transfer specification
- Layer 1 describes a binary-based format based on 25 predefined fixed-size records and the Log Information Standard (LIS) data-transmission specification
- Layer 2 describes bidirectional communication using LIS Comment records
- Layer 2b describes buffering of data
- Layer 4 extends the previous layers to use a different data exchange format, RP66

Though still in active use as of 2013, the specification has been superseded by the XML-based WITSML.

== See also ==
- Wellsite information transfer standard markup language
