= Industri Energi =

Norwegian trade union

- Founded: 2006
- Headquarters: Oslo, Stavanger
- Location: Norway
- Members: 57,000 (2019)
- Key people: Frode Alfheim
- Affiliations: LO
- Website: www.industrienergi.no

Industri Energi (Norwegian for "Industry Energy") is a Norwegian trade union for employees in the petroleum industry, the chemical industry, the pharmaceutical industry, the aluminium and metal industry and the forest industry.

The union is a member of the Norwegian Confederation of Trade Unions (LO). It was founded in 2006 with the merger of the Norwegian Union of Chemical Industry Workers and the Norwegian Oil and Petrochemical Union. On founding, it had 45,000 members. Like both its predecessors, it affiliated to the Norwegian Confederation of Trade Unions. The Association for Administrative, Leadership and Technical Positions merged in during 2008, while at the start of 2009, the Norwegian Union of Wood Workers merged in.

Industri Energi had approximately 56,100 members as of August 2022. The union leader from 2017 is Frode Alfheim. Deputy managers are Lill-Heidi Bakkerud and Ommund Stokka. Industri Energi is the largest union in companies like Equinor, Norsk Hydro and Orkla. It is a member of the IndustriALL Global Union, the International Transport Workers' Federation, the IndustriALL – European Trade Union, Industrianställda i Norden and International Union of Food, Agricultural, Hotel, Restaurant, Catering, Tobacco and Allied Workers' Association.

== Presidents ==
2017- : Frode Alfheim
2006-2017: Leif Sande
