= Leif Sande =

Norwegian politician (born 1953)

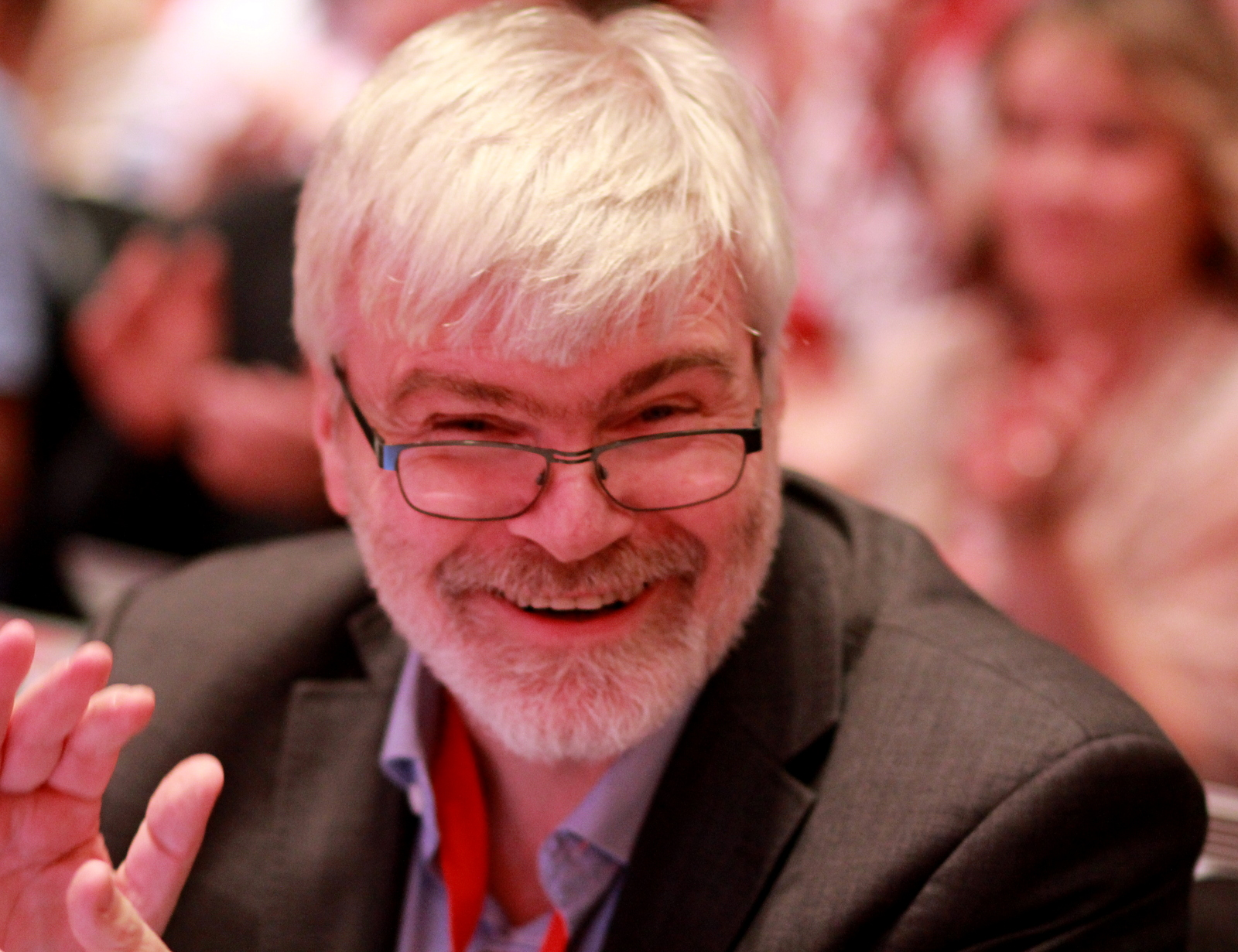
- Sande in 2013
- Born: 18 September 1953 (age 72)
- Occupations: trade unionist and politician
- Organization(s): Norwegian Oil and Petrochemical Union, Industri Energi

Leif Audun Sande (born 18 September 1953) is a Norwegian trade unionist and politician for the Socialist Left and Labour parties.

He hails from Lindås Municipality. He served as a deputy representative to the Parliament of Norway from Hordaland during the terms 1985–1989, 1989–1993 and 1993–1997. He was the vice president of the Norwegian Oil and Petrochemical Union from 1985 and president from 2000. In 2006 it merged to form Industri Energi, and Sande was president here until 2017.

For his new party, the Labour Party, Sande served as a deputy representative to the Parliament of Norway from Hordaland during the term 2017–2021. In total he has met during 309 days of parliamentary session.

Trade union offices
Preceded by Lars Anders Myhre	President of the Norwegian Oil and Petrochemical Union; 2000–2006	Succeeded by Union merged
Preceded by New position	President of Industri Energi; 2006–2017	Succeeded by Frode Alfheim
