= Halfdan Jønsson =

Norwegian trade unionist (1891–1945)

- Born: 15 May 1891; Frol Municipality
- Died: 7 February 1945 (aged 53); Dachau concentration camp
- Occupation: Trade unionist

Halfdan Jønsson (15 May 1891 – 7 February 1945) was a Norwegian trade unionist and resistance member. He was born in Frol Municipality. He was elected chairman of the Norwegian Union of Chemical Industry Workers in 1924. In 1934 he served as vice chairman of the Norwegian Confederation of Trade Unions, until November. He died in the Dachau concentration camp in 1945.
