= Integrated Operations in the High North =

- Logo for Integrated Operations in the High North.
- Abbreviation: IOHN or IO High North
- Formation: 2008-05-06
- Legal status: Project at Det Norske Veritas (DNV)
- Purpose: Designing, implementing and testing a Digital Platform for the next generation of Integrated Operations
- Location: Bærum, Norway
- Region served: Worldwide
- Members: 22
- Official language: English
- Project Manager: Frédéric Verhelst
- Main organ: Steering Committee

Integrated Operations in the High North (IOHN, IO High North or IO in the High North) is a unique collaboration project that during a four-year period starting May 2008 is working on designing, implementing and testing a Digital Platform for what in the upstream oil and gas industry is called the next or second generation of Integrated Operations. The work on the Digital platform is focussed on capture, transfer and integration of real-time data from the remote production installations to the decision makers. A risk evaluation across the whole chain is also included. The platform is based on open standards and enables a higher degree of interoperability. Requirements for the digital platform come from use cases defined within the Drilling and Completion, Reservoir and Production and Operations and Maintenance domains. The platform will subsequently be demonstrated through pilots within these three domains.

The project was a sidecar initiative for Statoil’s Global Operations Data Integration Project. This was part of a very ambitious Master Plan IT (MapIT), which also included the Real Time Visualization (RTV) tender. The RTV tender aimed to be an ontology-aware information workspace for a wide range of disciplines, as per the IO Capability Stack. Additionally, the sidecar project aimed to increase the semantic web knowledge among suppliers in the industry.

This new platform is considered an important enabler for safe and sustainable operations in remote, vulnerable and hazardous areas such as the High North, but the technology is clearly also applicable in more general applications.

The IOHN project consortium consists of 22 participants, including operators, service providers, software vendors, technology providers, research institutions and universities. In addition, the Norwegian Defence Force is working with the project to resolve common infrastructural and interoperability challenges.

The project is managed by Det Norske Veritas (DNV). Nils Sandsmark was the project manager during the initiation and start-up phase. Frédéric Verhelst took over as project manager from the beginning of 2009.

Financing comes from the participants and the Research Council of Norway (RCN) for parts of the project (GOICT and AutoConRig).

== Participants ==
The consortium consists of the following 22 participants (in alphabetical order):

ABB	Abelia	Baker Hughes	Cisco	Computas
Det Norske Veritas	ENI	Epsis	FMC Technologies	FSI
IO Center	IRIS	National Oilwell Varco	NTNU	OLF
POSC Caesar Association	Petroleum Safety Authority Norway	Siemens	Statoil	Norwegian Defence
University of Oslo	University of Stavanger			

== See also ==
- Integrated Operations
- Semantic Web
- ISO 15926 aka Oil and Gas Ontology, an enabler for the next or second generation of Integrated Operations by integrating data across disciplines and business domains.
- Petroleum exploration in the Arctic
- POSC Caesar Association, the custodian of ISO 15926, the Oil and Gas Ontology.
