= Monitoring as a service =

Monitoring as a service (MaaS) is a cloud-based framework for the deployment of monitoring functionalities for various other services and applications within the cloud. The most common application for MaaS is online state monitoring, which continuously tracks certain states of applications, networks, systems, instances or any element that may be deployable within the cloud.

== See also ==
- as a service
