= Norwegian Union of Chemical Industry Workers =

Norwegian trade union

- Norsk Kjemisk Industriarbeiderforbund
- Abbreviation: NKIF
- Merged into: Industri Energi
- Founded: 1 January 1924
- Dissolved: 2006
- Headquarters: Oslo, Norway
- Location: Norway
- Members: 32,000
- Affiliations: LO

The Norwegian Union of Chemical Industry Workers (Norwegian: Norsk Kjemisk Industriarbeiderforbund, NKIF) was a trade union representing workers in the chemical industry in Norway.

The union was founded in 1924, as a split from the Norwegian Union of General Workers. It affiliated with the Norwegian Confederation of Trade Unions (LO). By 1996, it had 32,031 members.

In 2006, the union merged with the Norwegian Oil and Petrochemical Union, to form Industri Energi.

== Presidents ==
1924: Halfdan Jønsson
1934:
1945: Karsten Torkildsen
1963: Anker Nordtvedt
1967:
1973: Håkon A. Ødegaard
1978: Arthur Svensson
1995: Olaf Støylen
