= ISO 15926 WIP =

Interoperability standard in the process industry

The ISO 15926 is an interoperability standard in the process industry. ISO 15926 includes the Work in Progress (WIP) database. WIP is available online and includes technical class descriptions of all the main equipment items, pipe, instruments, buildings, activities and anything else used in engineering, constructing, procuring, operating and maintaining process facilities.

== Description ==
The ISO 15926 Reference Data Library contains the approved core library set and the Object Information Models (e.g. product models), but is expanded with proposed classes and proposed model extensions.

== Work process ==
To expand the set, a user must be certified. This is to keep the Reference Data Library in a certain structure, and directly usable for all the various connected projects.

When a new item is submitted by a certified user, it can be used immediately, and it will also enter an approval cycle performed by modeling and domain matter experts. In this cycle the new item can reach a higher status of approval; up until ISO certification.

== History ==
In order to create the WIP, the builders needed to have the content, the infrastructure and the tools.

- The content was created originally by many companies, starting around 1992. At some point it was divided up into Reference Data Libraries called STEPlib (of USPI) and PClib (of POSC Caesar Association). In 2005-2006, these libraries were merged again into the present content. About 10,000 classes are now (2007) ISO certified. That set is called the core library. In the near future the content will be expanded by the POSC Caesar IDS project, with new classes and with Object Information Models.
- The infrastructure is created by the POSC Caesar Association RDS (Reference Data System) project. It consists of Express-native and SQL Server databases which can be opened through multiple web-enabled screens. Some screens are targeted for engineers and some for modelers. In 2007 and 2008 it will be in operation with 24/7 access. This infrastructure will be kept as a test to gain experience with the procedures and operations. In the future ISO Maintenance Agency will take over the content and it may be brought into a different infrastructure, using the gained experience.
- The tools are created by the POSC Caesar RDS project and the FIATECH ADI project.
