= 1990 Norwegian oil workers' strike =

Labor dispute in Norway

1990 Norwegian oil strike
- Date: 1–7 July 1990 (6 days)
- Location: North Sea
- Caused by: Disagreements concerning pay and working conditions
- Methods: Picketing; Strike action

Parties
Norwegian Oil and Petrochemical Workers Union; Federation of Oil Workers' Trade Union	Norwegian Oil Industry Association

In July 1990, about 4,000 Norwegian workers on oil platforms in the North Sea went on strike. The strike lasted from 1 to 7 July before the strikers returned to work. The strike was due to disagreements between the workers, represented by the Norwegian Oil and Petrochemical Workers Union and the Federation of Oil Workers' Trade Union, and several employers, represented by the Norwegian Oil Industry Association, concerning pay and working conditions. A day after the strike began, the national government imposed compulsory arbitration and ordered the strikers to return to work, though about 1,000 individuals defied the orders and continued to strike. In response, several employees were dismissed and Statoil (one of the employers) blocked communications between strikers on the oil platforms and the mainland. By 5 July, production had resumed at several facilities, and on 7 July, Statoil employees ceased striking.

== Background ==
=== Petroleum industry in Norway ===
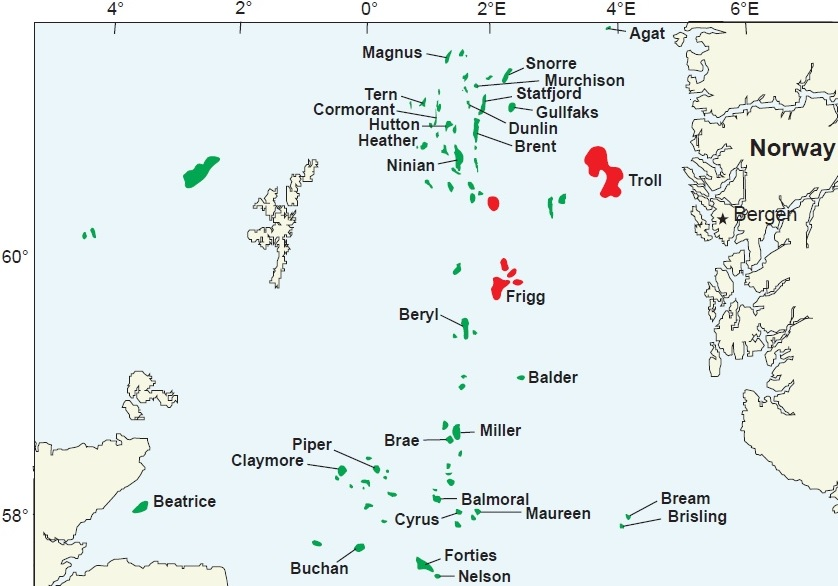
A map of several oil fields (in green) in the North Sea

Norway was one of the largest producers of petroleum in Europe in 1990, second only to the United Kingdom in western Europe. At the time, the country produced approximately 1.7 million barrels per day, with oil production responsible for roughly a quarter of the country's annual income. Much of the country's petroleum production was performed by Statoil, a state-owned enterprise which at the time operated seven oil platforms in the North Sea.

=== Labor negotiations in 1990 ===
In 1990, employers and employees in the country's offshore drilling industry negotiated new labor agreements, with the employers represented by the Norwegian Oil Industry Association (an employers' organization) and the employees represented primarily by two trade unions—the Norwegian Oil and Petrochemical Workers Union and the Federation of Oil Workers' Trade Unions. The former was affiliated with the Norwegian Confederation of Trade Unions (a trade union federation) while the latter was an independent union.

Going into the negotiation, the employees and employers had been operating under a government-mandated wage freeze for the past two years. The employees were seeking an increase in pay, but were disadvantaged in the negotiations by a high unemployment rate and relatively low oil prices. Of the two unions, the Federation of Oil Workers was the more adamant in seeking gains from the employers, with the primary subject of the negotiations concerning pay and working conditions. The employers' organization was seeking a labor agreement more in-line with a moderate stance that had been agreed to nationwide between the Norwegian Confederation of Trade Unions and the Confederation of Norwegian Enterprise. As negotiations were fruitless, the two sides entered into compulsory mediation through the National Mediator of Norway, though without success.

With no agreement reached, the employees gave a deadline of 1 July for a strike action to commence. It would be the industry's first since a 19-day strike against Statoil in 1986, which ended with the national government imposing compulsory arbitration on the two parties. Speculation regarding a strike caused an uptick in the price of oil in the days leading up to the deadline.

== Course of the strike ==
=== Beginning of the strike ===
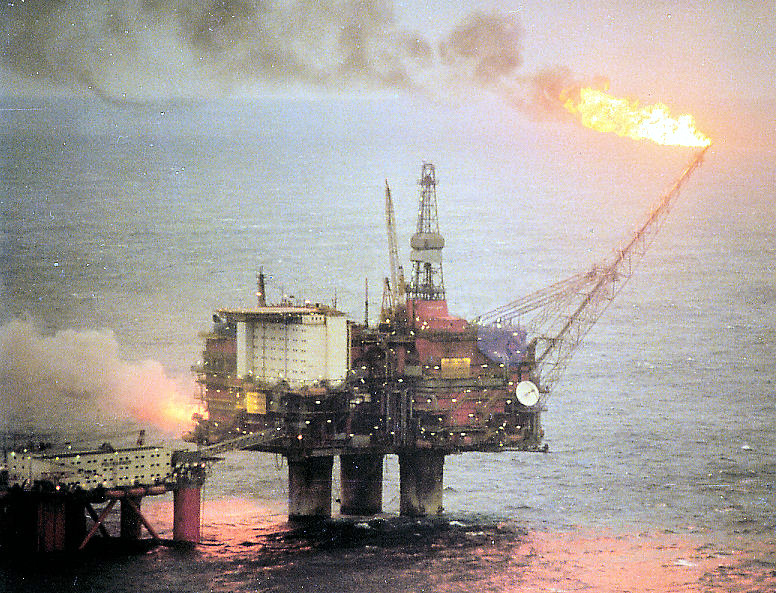
A Statoil-operated oil platform in the Statfjord oil field, pictured 1982

The strike began at midnight on 1 July 1990, with approximately 4,000 workers engaging in a work stoppage. In addition to Statoil, other impacted companies included British Petroleum, Phillips Petroleum Company, and Smedvig. Specific oil fields affected by the labor dispute included Ekofisk, Gullfaks, Gyda, Statfjord, Ula, and Veslefrikk. Additionally, operators in other North Sea oil fields, such as Valhall, were affected because their output flows went through Ekofisk, which is a major hub on the region's oil pipeline system. Ekofisk, which typically produced about 240,000 barrels per day, was completely shut down.

=== Government and employers response ===
Going into the strike, union leader Harald Sjonfjell was skeptical that the national government would impose compulsory arbitration as had occurred in the 1986 strike. In this earlier instance, the unions appealed the decision to the International Labour Organization, which had found that there had been issues in the procedure's application. However, Johan J. Jakobsen, the Minister of Local Government and Labour who was serving as the country's acting head of government while Prime Minister Jan P. Syse was traveling abroad, led the Centre Party in the Storting to mandate compulsory arbitration on 2 July. Additionally, the national government imposed a back-to-work order on the strikers, saying that a prolonged strike could severely damage the nation's economy. Despite union agreement to the order, many of the workers continued to strike, with some blockading helipads to prevent strikebreakers from landing on the platforms. In response, Jakobsen saying that any workers continuing to engage in strike action would be subject to possible dismissal.

By the afternoon of 2 July, with the striking having become illegal under Norwegian law, about 1,000 workers continued with their work stoppage, primarily on Statoil's facilities in Gullfaks and Statfjord and Philips Petroleum's facilities in Ekofisk. Because of the latter, many other facilities continued to be indirectly affected, as they could not transport their petroleum through Ekofisk's pipeline system. Picketing continued on several platforms, and the striking began to be locally coordinated, with no involvement from union leaders on the mainland.

In response to the continued labor action, Statoil blocked communications between employees on the platforms and the mainland. Additionally, recordings of a speech made by Harald Norvik, the company's chief executive officer, were delivered to the platforms and broadcast repeatedly, with Norvik saying that continued strike action could have consequences for those involved.

=== End of the strike ===
By 5 July, most of the strikers had returned to work. That day, strikers on the Ekofisk field ceased striking, with Philips Petroleum saying that they expected to return to their normal production rates within several days. Statoil resumed some production but ceased by the evening of 6 July due to a lack of workers. The following day, two Statoil workers in the Statfjord field were dismissed, and around the same time, twenty Smedvig employees were dismissed. On 7 July, Statoil workers ended their strike.

== Impact and aftermath ==
According to contemporary reporting in The Oklahoman, news organizations estimated that the strike would result in a daily loss of income of about $31 million (equivalent to $76 million in 2025). Multiple news sources reported on 6 July that, by that time, the strike had led to a loss of revenue of approximately $95 million ($234 million in 2025). Additionally, the strike caused significant volatility in several stock markets. Within a year of the strike, all employees who had been fired by Statoil were rehired. In August 1990, Norwegian oil platforms experienced additional strike action from construction workers who were seeking union recognition.

== See also ==
- History of Statoil (1972–2007)
- North Sea oil
- Timeline of strikes in 1990
