= Lighting as a service =

Business model

Lighting as a service (LaaS), also known as light as a service, is a service-based business model in which lighting service is charged on a subscription basis rather than via a one-time payment. It is managed by specialized service providers and may include light design, financing, installation, maintenance and other services. The model involves outsourcing of lighting aspects of a business over a period of time.

In opposition to an operating lease, the LaaS provider does not transfer the ownership of a product but maintains the ownership of the equipment throughout the duration of the subscription contract. This makes it an environmentally friendly business approach allowing an extended product life with several lifecycles. The LaaS model has become more common in commercial installations of LED lights, specifically in retrofitting buildings and outdoor facilities, with the prior aim of reducing installation costs. Since nowadays lighting design has to consider aspects such as safety and health at work, environmental performance, energy consumption and durability of the products, the model is continuously gaining more and more importance for company structures. Refitting and maintaining buildings with energy efficient lighting systems can enable it to be operated more economically. Light vendors have used an LaaS strategy in selling value-added services such as Internet-connected lighting and energy management.

== History ==
Over the years, the lighting industry has faced a major disruption due to the shift in demand from conventional light sources to energy-efficient lighting. Especially in the commercial sector, this industrial change has caused a higher demand in long-life LED products, which come along with lower energy consumption and improved physical robustness. While light bulbs have to be replaced approximately every year or two, LED products last around 20 years. The idea of Lighting as a Service was invented in response to business demand in order to decrease the costs and boost the efficiency of energy without any investment from the end users side. LaaS utilizes light control systems and the Internet of Things.

The concept of selling lighting as a service was developed by Thomas Rau in collaboration with Philips throughout the first "Pay per Lux" project. Customers would only pay for the amount of light they use. The idea originated when Thomas Rau equipped the office of RAU Architects in Amsterdam. Instead of purchasing lighting infrastructure that comes with high costs and the need to be replaced after some time, he applied the model of light as a service to furnish the building with lighting. LED installations along with a sensor and controller system to minimize energy use were provided by Philips, who maintained the ownership of the set-up. RAU Architects on the other hand benefited from the entire maintenance service.

During the COVID-19 pandemic, LaaS providers increased the sale of products such as ultraviolet lighting, as some types of ultraviolet lighting can kill COVID-19.

== Pros and Cons ==
=== Pros ===
Since no upfront investment has to be done, the subscription to LaaS offers comes with less engagement of personal resources. This subsequently has a positive impact on the reduction of risks and costs for the end user. Furthermore, modern lighting technology solutions, such as intelligent LED light systems or daylight and shading technology, used by LaaS vendors result in a lower energy consumption, thus lower energy costs as well as the reduction of carbon emissions and a healthier lighting in general. The light supplier as an expert in the light industry remains accountable for monitoring and maintaining the lighting systems (including replacements), upholding new legal requirements and also deals with recycling issues.

=== Cons ===
The subscription to LaaS offerings does not involve the acquisition of the lighting product(s), as products are owned by the service provider. Throughout the duration of the contract the client is bound to the provider, meaning the contract cannot be cancelled.

== Market ==
=== Major Regions and Companies ===
In terms of geographical distribution, the LaaS market is categorized into seven main regions: North and Latin America, Eastern Europe, Western Europe, Asia-Pacific, Japan and the Middle East and Africa. North America constitutes the largest market for LaaS, followed by Western and Eastern Europe, which is expected to witness the fastest growth rate in 2018-2025. This change is attributed to the widespread adoption of LaaS in Germany and the UK. Major companies in the LaaS market include Cooper Industries Inc. (US), SIB Lighting (US), Cree Inc. (US), Digital Lumens Inc. (US), Lutron Electronics Company Inc. (US), General Electric Lighting (US), Itelecom USA (US), Future Energy Solutions (US & UK), Igor Inc. (UK), Legrand (France), Koninklijke Philips N.V. (Netherlands), Eaton Corporation (Ireland), Urban Volt (Ireland), Zumtobel Group (Austria), Osram Ag (Germany), Deutsche Lichtmiete (Germany) and RCG Lighthouse (Latvia). The leading position of North America in the LaaS market is mostly due to the significant development regarding electricity consumption in the United States. The government implementations of certain energy standards help reduce its carbon emission as well as the energy consumption rate, mostly through usage of energy efficient light bulbs. These have to be either LED or fluorescent. The adoption of LED lighting on the other hand is catering to the market growth of LaaS models. The most prominent lighting renovation project is the Bristol-Myers Squibb in Lawrenceville. The prior aim of the project is to harvest daylight through control systems and thus reduce the energy consumption for office spaces. In the meantime LaaS companies in Europe come up with different lighting solutions such as for example the launch of emergency lighting for big open-plan areas by Eaton. Furthermore, cooperations between light vendors and LaaS providers such as the alliance between Zumtobel and Deutsche Lichtmiete lead to improved full-service business models, allowing to broaden the application segments.

== See also ==
- as a service
