= Wardley map =

Map for business strategy

A Wardley map is a map for business strategy. Components are positioned within a value chain and anchored by the user need, with movement described by an evolution axis. Wardley maps are named after Simon Wardley who created the technique at Fotango in 2005 having created the evolutionary framing the previous year. The technique was further developed within Canonical UK between 2008 and 2010 and components of mapping can be found in the "Better for Less" paper published in 2010.

== Summary ==
Each component in a Wardley map is plotted according to its position in two dimensions:

- in the vertical dimension or y-axis, the component's position within the value chain, corresponding to its visibility to the end-user (whether customer, consumer, business, government or other);
- in the horizontal dimension or x-axis, the component's evolution or commoditization (ranging from "genesis" through "custom build" and "product" to "commodity").

Components are drawn as nodes linked by lines representing dependencies between them. The map is oriented towards the customer or end-user, at the very top of the value chain (and therefore the highest component in the vertical dimension). Directly beneath the end-user are nodes representing the user needs the company seeks to meet, and beneath these in turn are nodes representing components required to meet these needs, and so on. Each component also has a position on the horizontal axis corresponding to its evolution: components to the left are less evolved (rare or not-yet-extant, with higher risk of failure) and components to the right are more evolved (common and standardized, with lower risk of failure). Novel stage components which are highly visible to the end-user are therefore found in the top-left of the map, whereas commodity components abstracted away from the end-user are found in the bottom-right.

Much of the theory of Wardley mapping is set out in a series of nineteen blog posts written by Wardley which is a summary of Wardley's previous blog posts. The posts are provided as an unfinished, creative commons book.

== Example ==
Imagine that a company wants to set up a new drone courier service. The user need is to receive packages quickly from the company. The company objective is to meet this user need by delivering packages quickly to customers. This is a high-value, low-commodity component and is placed at the top-left of a Wardley map. If there were dozens of competing drone courier companies, this component would move right on the Wardley map, indicating that the service is closer to being a commodity.

Other components are mapped similarly. For example, a drone operator needs to be aware of the weather conditions to determine the route a drone should take and the maximum weight it can carry. Weather information is of little value to the customer and can be bought from a wide range of weather data providers. It is thus placed at the bottom-right of the Wardley map.

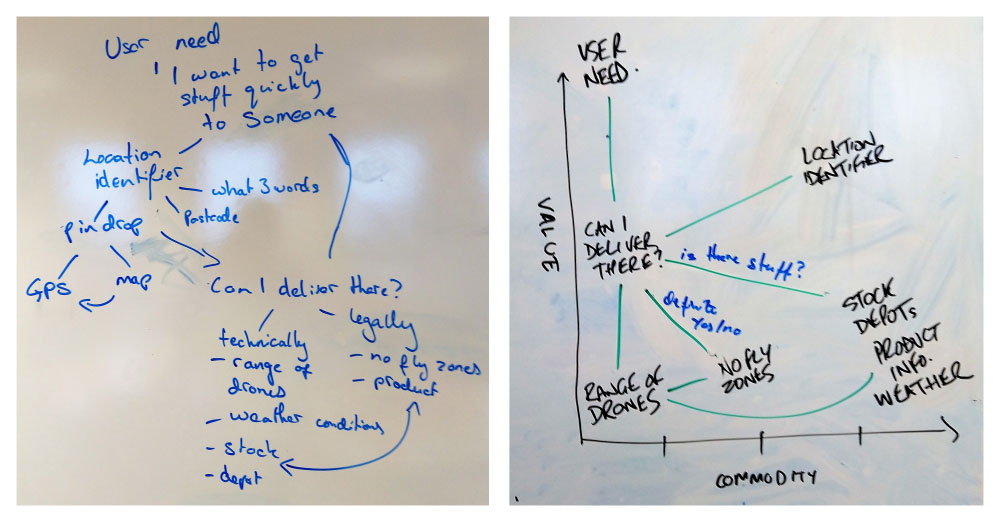
Key components needed to set up a drone courier service (left). The same components on a Wardley map (right).

== Uses ==
Wardley maps are used within UK government, with particular interest within the Government Digital Service (GDS) for strategic planning and identifying the best targets for government digital service modernisation.

They have been used to map the existing and planned technology infrastructure and services for High Speed 2 (HS2).

They have been used to map the value chain and maturity of components in security operations to support a large scale commercial organisation decide to build or outsource their security operations centre, SOC Value Chain & Delivery Models.

== Tools ==
A number of tools exist including Online Wardley Maps, templates in Miro, plugins for Visual Studio, MapScript, Wardley Map generator in Golang, MapKeep, Glamorous Toolkit, and Mermaid.js.

== Criticisms ==
Simon Wardley claims that much of the process's value lies in "exposing assumptions. allowing challenge and creating consensus" — but detractors worry that the process in fact lets people "launder assumptions into facts, delegitimise challenge (and still create consensus)".
