= Valdek Laas =

Estonian serial killer and rapist

- Born: 1949; Estonian SSR
- Died: 1999 (aged 44); Patarei Prison, Estonia
- Convictions: Multiple rape convictions, none for murder
- Penalty: 13 years imprisonment (1975); 6 year and 9 months imprisonment (1989)

Details
- Victims: 3
- Span of crimes: May – October 1996
- Country: Estonia
- States: Tartu, Valga
- Date apprehended: 16 May 1997

Valdek Laas (1949 – 1999) was an Estonian serial killer and serial rapist who committed a series of sexually motivated attacks in southern Estonia between May and October 1996, killing three elderly women in the process. He was charged with the murders and pleaded guilty, but was never sentenced because he died in hospital from tuberculosis complications.

== Early crimes ==
Little is known about Laas' early life. Born in 1949, he was first convicted of a violent crime in 1975, when he raped a young girl in the village of Nõgiaru. At the time, he worked at a sovkhoz, and managed to lure the underage victim to a nearby forest. This crime resulted in him receiving 13 years imprisonment behind bars.

After his imprisonment and later release, Laas committed a series of rapes in Valga County between 1988 and 1989, with the victims being two women – 79-year-old Linda and 94-year-old Liidia. He was eventually convicted of these crimes, but received a lenient sentence of 6 years and 9 months imprisonment. Laas served it out in full, and after his release from prison, he resumed his criminal offences.

== Murders ==
On 31 May 1996, Laas broke into a small house in the village of Rõngu, where he raped and killed an 84-year-old woman named Maie, stabbing her multiple times in the chest with a bayonet. Her body was discovered approximately five days later by a social worker who had gone to check on her.

On 22 September, he broke into another home in Ervu, where he stabbed to death 84-year-old Alma while she was still lying in bed. Her body was discovered three days later by her daughter, who usually went to check in on her because the victim had a heart condition.

The final murder occurred on 30 October, when Laas stabbed to death 87-year-old Hilda at her farm in Pühajärve.

== Arrest ==
The recent murders of elderly women drew the attention of the authorities, as the fact that all were stabbed in the chests and nothing appeared to be stolen from the houses indicated that they were killed by the same man. However, they were unable to identify a suspect at the time due to a lack of evidence.

Around mid-May 1997, authorities in Viljandi and Valga Counties started receiving reports about a suspicious middle-aged man going around rural villages and asking for alcohol, but also inquired if there were any lonely elderly people around. Further investigation revealed that in the span of several days, several elderly women had been physically and sexually assaulted by a man who demanded money from them and threatened them with a bayonet.

After interviewing several witnesses, officers got a description of the man and his Lada Izhevsk motorcycle, eventually identifying him as Valdek Laas, a postman and convicted rapist who lived in Pringi. On 16 May, he was tracked down to a forest near his homestead and promptly arrested. When he was brought into the Viljandi Detention Center for interrogation, Laas started confessing not only to the rapes, but also for the three murders that he had committed in 1996.

== Charges and death ==
Following his confessions, Laas actively participated in the investigations and showed how he had carried out the crimes in great detail, claiming that he carried them out because he liked having sex with elderly women. Over the course of the investigation, he was charged with three counts of murder and several counts of rape to which he would eventually plead guilty. However, his sentencing would be delayed because Laas suffered from tuberculosis, due to which he had to receive treatment at the Patarei Prison Hospital in Tallinn. By November 1998, a court determined that he was unfit to stand trial due to his ongoing treatment.

At some point during 1999, Laas' condition rapidly worsened and he eventually died. As a result, trial proceedings were terminated and the murder cases were officially closed.

== See also ==
- List of serial killers by country
- List of serial rapists
