= Desktop outsourcing =

Desktop outsourcing is the process in which an organization contracts a third party to maintain and manage parts of its IT infrastructure. Contracts vary in depth and can range from Computer hard- and software maintenance to Desktop virtualisation, SaaS-implementations and Helpdesk operation. It is estimated, that 32% of U.S. and Canadian IT organisations make use of desktop outsourcing in 2014. Recent market reports suggest the adoption of BYOD policies to allow the end-user a free choice of devices in their working environment may increase this market share.

== Viability ==
Justification for desktop outsourcing could include shifting focus and energy to areas of core competency, reducing staffing costs, and the routine maintenance, upgrades, and repairs associated with managing multitudes of PC systems and servers. (Applegate et al. 2007). Managers may also seek desktop outsourcing as a method of simplifying organisational structures to cut costs associated with them. For smaller companies it might also be more viable financially to outsource their desktop at a set price per machine, rather than creating an entire internal IT department. Recent market growth can also be attributed to the decreasing price of hardware, making replacement more favourable than repairs. Possible risks when desktop outsourcing are ensuring continued support for old and unique systems the company depends on, specifically if any of the systems in question were internally developed. This may cause the contractor to be unable to fulfill their contractual obligations, as in the case of the US Navy outsourcing their IT systems to EDS in 2003.

== Market situation ==
A 2012 TechNavio market report forecasts that the desktop outsourcing market will grow by 4.65% yearly, between 2012 and 2016. Atos, CSC, HP and IBM are considered the leading desktop outsourcing vendors for that time frame. A Gartner report from 2013, however, considers the desktop outsourcing market to be in decline, with growth only occurring on the Latin American and Asia/Pacific markets.

== Examples ==
- While consolidating School Districts in 2003, New York City brought in Dell to assess and consolidate their IT systems. At the time it was unclear how many devices actually existed in the network. Being largely successful, this netted Dell a $20 million yearly contract to keep on managing the School Districts systems.
- NASA's Kennedy Space Center had its IT services, approximately 22,000 devices, outsourced in 1998 for $30 million a year on a 3-year contract.
- The US Treasury outsourced their 1643 desktop and 700 portable seats in 1999 for around $27 million yearly.
