= Norwegian Oil and Petrochemical Union =

Norwegian trade union

Logo of the union

The Norwegian Oil and Petrochemical Union (Norwegian: Norsk Olje- og Petrokjemisk Fagforbund, NOPEF) was a trade union representing workers in the oil and petrochemical sector in Norway.

The union was founded in 1977, and immediately affiliated to the Norwegian Confederation of Trade Unions. By 1996, it had 12,334 members.

In 2006, it merged with the Norwegian Union of Chemical Industry Workers, to form Industri Energi.

== Presidents ==
1977: Lars Anders Myhre
2000: Leif Sande

== See also ==
- 1990 Norwegian oil workers' strike
