= Simon Wardley =

British businessman and researcher

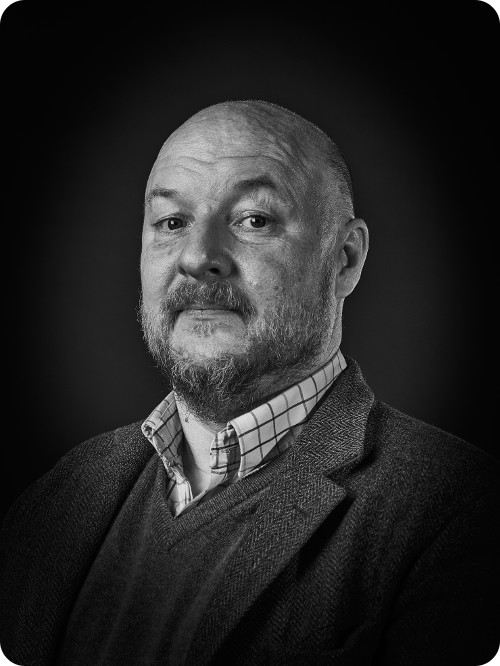
- Wardley at the State of Open Conference, 2023
- Born: United Kingdom
- Occupation: Researcher
- Known for: Wardley mapping
- Website: https://www.swardleymaps.com/

Simon Wardley is a British researcher and former CEO best known for the creation of Wardley mapping.

== Wardley mapping ==
A Wardley map is a map for business strategy. It is a strategic management technique used to visualise the components of a business or a service on a two-dimensional map. This helps in understanding the current situation and planning for the future by considering how different parts of the business evolve over time.

Components are positioned within a value chain and anchored by the user need, with movement described by an evolution axis. The two axes of the map represent:

- Y-axis (Value chain): This axis represents the visibility of a component to the end-user. Components higher up on the map are more visible and directly related to user needs, while those lower down are less visible but still necessary to deliver the overall value.
- X-axis (Evolution): This axis represents the stage of evolution of a component, ranging from novel and uncertain (Genesis) on the left to well-defined and widely available (Commodity) on the right. The stages in between are Custom-Built and Product/Rental.

By plotting components on this map and understanding their dependencies, organisations can gain insights into strategic decisions such as where to invest, where to innovate, and what to commoditise or outsource.
