= Wellsite information transfer standard markup language =

Web development language

WITSML is a standard for transmitting technical data between organisations in the petroleum industry. It continues to be developed by an Energistics facilitated Special Interest Group to develop XML standards for drilling, completions, and interventions data exchange. Organizations for which WITSML is targeted include energy companies, service companies, drilling contractors, application vendors and regulatory agencies.

A modern drilling rig or offshore platform uses a diverse array of specialist contractors, each of whom need to communicate data to the oil company operating the rig, and to each other. Historically this was done with serial transfer of ASCII data.

== Purpose ==
The drilling, completions, and interventions functions of the upstream oil and natural gas industry need universally available standards to facilitate the free flow of technical data across networks between oil companies, service companies, drilling contractors, application vendors and regulatory agencies.

The WITSML initiative was started to address this need, and through its success, is now influencing petroleum industry data standards beyond the original scope.

WITSML Standards support the “right time” seamless flow of drilling and completions data between data producers and data consumers to speed and enhance decision-making in the drilling and completions domain.

The WITSML Special Interest Group (SIG) is open to all industry organizations who wish to contribute to the further development of the WITSML Standards. Energistics has custody of the standards and hosts the SIG. Energistics makes these and other industry standards available for use by all industry companies through a licensing agreement that is free of any fees or charges.

== Standards used ==
WITSML Standards are defined using the W3C Internet standards for XML (notably XML Schema) and Web Services (including SOAP and WSDL)). The WITSML Standards define Web Services that define client/server interactions, known as the WITSML Application Programming Interface specifications. The WITSML Standards define more than 20 industry domain specific XML data object schemas to support drilling, completions, and intervention business functions.

WITSML standards and versions
v2.0	now uses the Energistics Transfer Protocol (ETP) v1.1	February 2017
v1.4.1.1	API	September 2011
v1.3.1	superseded by Version 1.3.1.1(bugfix)s	March 2006 (now legacy)

== WITS and WITSML ==
WITS was a precursor of WITSML based on serial data exchange on a "Point to Point" basis, developed in the early 1980s (SPE Paper 16141) and was transferred to the American Petroleum Institute as a standard. However the rapid evolution of network technology, and the richness of data from LWD and rig data systems, drove BP and Statoil to explore a change to the standard. The initial project in 2000, DART ( Drilling Automation Real Time) was a CORBA approach, but this was dropped in favour of an XML based approach, that became WitsML. BP and Statoil passed custody of the new standard to Energistics in 2003.

== EnergyML ==
EnergyML is the foundation for consistency and interoperability among all Energistics data transfer families of standards, including besides the WITSML Standards, PRODML for production and RESQML for reservoir characterization.

== Support for Distributed Temperature Survey Data ==
A data exchange capability for distributed fibre-optic sensor (DTS) technology data was developed as an extension to the WITSML Standard based on previous work by BP. The DTS capability was reviewed and published with WITSML Standard Version 1.3.1 in December 2005.

With the initiation of a related family of standards for production, PRODML, and its user community, the PRODML Special Interest Group, the DTS capabilities are being transferred to the PRODML Standards, which is more appropriate from a business function viewpoint. There will be no gap in support for DTS data exchanges as this transfer takes place.

== Open Source ==
In November 2016, Petrotechnical Data Systems (PDS) announced the release of the Wellsite Information Transfer Standard Markup Language (WITSML), and two primary components, WITSML Server and WITSML Studio, under an Apache License.

== See also ==
- XML
- Wellsite Information Transfer Specification
