= PRODML =

Web services

PRODML is a family of XML and Web Services based upstream oil and natural gas industry standards from Energistics and its PRODML Special Interest Group (PRODML SIG).

PRODML Standards support automated production data acquisition, operations monitoring, optimization, reporting, and configuration management business processes. PRODML-based interactions are used by production software components, including field data historians, surveillance applications, model analysis and management applications, optimization applications, simulation applications, etc.

The PRODML initiative was started in 2005 by five energy companies: BP, Chevron, ExxonMobil, Shell, and Statoil, joined by eight supplier companies: Halliburton, Invensys, Kongsberg Gruppen, OSIsoft, Petroleum Experts, Schlumberger, Tieto, and Weatherford as well as Energistics.

PRODML standards and versions
v2.3	Latest data schema and API specification (XML & JSON schemas; supports ETP web services)	January 2025 (current)
v2.1	Prior stable data schema specification (incremental changes from v2.0)	June 2019
v2.0	Earlier data schema and basic production domain data objects	December 2016 (now legacy)

PRODML evolved from the Energistics family of standards for drilling, completions and interventions, WITSML, initiated in 2000.

== EnergyML ==
EnergyML is the foundation for consistency and interoperability among all Energistics data transfer families of standards, including besides the PRODML Standards, WITSML for drilling, completions, and interventions and RESQML for reservoir characterization.

== See also ==
- WITSML
