= Norwegian Oil and Gas =

Industrial Organization

The Norwegian Oil and Gas Association (Norwegian: Norsk olje og gass) is the former name for Offshore Norway, a trade association for offshore energy and supplier companies.

== See also ==
- 1990 Norwegian oil workers' strike
