= IBM Cloud =

Cloud computing platform by IBM

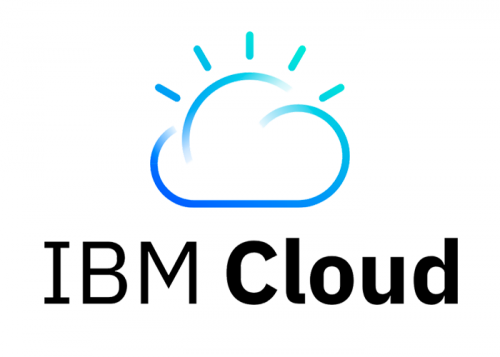
- Developer: IBM
- Type: cloud computing, IaaS, PaaS, cloud services, Web service
- Website: www.ibm.com/cloud

IBM Cloud is a cloud computing platform offered by the information technology company IBM that provides a suite of services including infrastructure as a service (IaaS), platform as a service (PaaS), serverless, Cloud storage, disaster recovery and backup, and managed cloud services. The IBM Cloud platform supports public cloud, private cloud, multi-cloud and hybrid cloud deployment models with an emphasis on enterprise security, governance, and regulated workloads.

== Overview ==
The IBM Cloud platform combines infrastructure and platform services into a single environment accessible through the IBM Cloud console, CLI, APIs, and infrastructure‑as‑code tools. IBM Cloud is used to deploy and manage applications, data, and services across public cloud regions, on‑premises environments, and other cloud platforms.

IBM Cloud represents a strategic approach to cloud computing that prioritizes enterprise-grade reliability, security, and customization. It is engineered for organizations with complex regulatory requirements, legacy system integration needs, and mission-critical workloads.

=== Architecture and Infrastructure ===
IBM Cloud supports hybrid cloud and multi-cloud deployment models, which enables organizations to run and manage workloads across public cloud, private cloud, on-premises environments, and other cloud platforms from different providers. This approach is commonly used by enterprises seeking flexibility in workload placement while maintaining centralized governance and security controls.

IBM Cloud integrates with container orchestration management technologies such as Red Hat OpenShift, allowing applications to be deployed and operated consistently across heterogenous environments include multiple public clouds and on-premises infrastructure. This model supports applications portability and reduces dependency on a single cloud provider.

The platform is frequently used in industries with regulatory and operational requirements, such as financial services, healthcare, and government, where hybrid and multi-cloud architectures and employed to address data residency, compliance, and risk management considerations.

==== Global Data Centers ====
As of 2026, IBM states that its cloud infrastructure spans more than 60 data centers across 19 countries and six multizone regions. The platform is organized into regions and availability zones designed to provide fault tolerance and high availability. IBM has establish availability zones in major markets including:

- North America (Dallas, Washington D.C., San Jose, Toronto, Montreal)
- South America (Sao Paulo)
- Europe (London, Frankfurt, Madrid, London, Paris, Amsterdam)
- Asia-Pacific (Tokyo, Osaka, Sydney, Singapore, Chennai)

Each availability zone is an isolated physical location within a region with independent power, cooling, and networking infrastructure.

=== Security ===
IBM Cloud provides a range of security and compliance services designed to support enterprise, government, and regulated-industry workloads. The platform incorporates Identity and access management, encryption services, confidential computing capability, and network security controls to help organizations protect applications and data across hybrid and multi-cloud environments.

IBM Cloud supports industry compliance standards and certifications including ISO 27001, SOC 2, HIPAA, HITRUST, PCI DSS, FedRAMP, MeitY, and GDPR-related controls. The platform has emphasized zero trust security principles and the use of hardware-based security technologies, including confidential computing solutions developed in collaboration with IBM Research. Security features are integrated across IBM Cloud infrastructure, Kubernetes services, AI platforms, and storage offerings to address cybersecurity, privacy, and data sovereignty requirements.

=== Hybrid Cloud ===
Through its acquisition of Red Hat, IBM positions OpenShift as a central layer for deploying and managing applications consistently across environments. This approach allows enterprises to avoid vendor lock-in by using Open source technologies, maintain workloads across multiple cloud providers, and gradually modernize legacy applications.

==== Red Hat OpenShift on IBM Cloud ====
IBM Cloud offers a fully managed Red Hat OpenShift service that automates the deployment and ongoing management of OpenShift clusters. The service provides several key lifecycle management features.

==== Automated updates and patching ====
IBM Cloud handles automated provisioning and updates for the OpenShift configuration and underlying infrastructure including operating system security patches.

== Products and services ==
IBM Cloud provides a suite of over 190 products and services, focusing on hybrid cloud, AI and security. Key offerings include Red Hat OpenShift on IBM Cloud for Kubernetes, IBM watsonx, IBM Cloud Paks for containerized software and secure infrastructure like Bare-metal servers. The platform supports enterprise workloads across financial services and other industries with a focus on compliance and security. IBM Cloud offers standard cloud computing services including:

- AI and Data: Including watsonx, Instruct Lab on IBM Cloud
- Compute: Virtual servers, bare metal servers, and Serverless computing through IBM Cloud Code Engine
- Storage: Object storage, block storage, and file storage
- Networking: Virtual private clouds, load balancers, and content delivery networks
- Databases: Managed database services including Db2, PostgresSQL, and MongoDB

=== AI and Machine Learning ===
- watsonx Assistant
- watsonx.ai Studio
- IBM Master Data Management
- IBM watsonx Code Assistant
- Knowledge Studio
- Natural Language Understanding
- Red Hat AI InstructLab
- Speech to Text
- Text to Speech
- Watson Discovery
- watsonx
- watsonx BI
- watsonx Orchestrate
- watsonx.ai Runtime
- watsonx.data intelligence
- watsonx.governance

=== Analytics ===
- DataStage
- Analytics Engine:
- IBM Master Data Management
- OpenPages
- Planning Analytics
- Streaming Analytics
- watsonx.data integration
- Cloud Pak for Data

=== Compute ===
==== Virtual Machines ====
- Virtual Server for VPC
- Virtual Server for Classic
- Dedicated Host for VPC
- IBM Cloud Reservations for VPC
- Power Virtual Server
- Backup and Recovery Data Source Connector
- IBM Spectrum Symphony
- SAP BW/4Hana Linux on VPC
- SAP NetWeaver(ABAP) Linux/Db2 standard on VPC
- SAP S/4HANA Linux - High Availability on VPC
- SAP S/4HANA Linux on VPC

==== Bare Metal Servers ====
- Bare Metal Server for Classic
- Bare Metal Servers for VPC
- VCF as a Service
- VMware Solutions

==== Class infrastructure ====
- Cloud HSM

==== Cloud images ====
- IBM LSF
- Microsoft SQL Server 2022 Standard on Windows Server 2022

==== Others ====
- HA and DR Automation for IBM Power Virtual Server
- Qiskit Runtime
- Satellite

=== Containers ===
IBM Cloud has been positioned as a platform focused on containers and microservices through its support of open-source technologies such as Kubernetes and Red Hat OpenShift.

- IBM Cloud Kubernetes Service
- Red Hat OpenShift on IBM Cloud
- Container Registry
- IBM Cloud Code Engine
- Container Security Services

=== IBM Paver: AI Operator for Infrastructure [2026] ===
IBM Paver is an AI based infrastructure operations tool available across IBM Infrastructure. It was released in 2026. Paver is an agentic experience focused on operations and deployment embedded in IBM Cloud, Power, Storage, TLS & Z platforms. It is designed to allow administrators to deploy, operate, and troubleshoot cloud infrastructure using natural language requests. Paver interprets a requested outcome, evaluates the state of the user's infrastructure, generates a plan, assesses the risks associated with proposed actions, and can execute approved changes using existing infrastructure tools and workflows. Paver is designed as an infrastructure operator that can plan and execute approved actions against infrastructure environments.

Paver includes an approval system called Paver Guard, which evaluates proposed infrastructure operations and can require human approval before consequential changes are executed. Operations are limited by the permissions of the user's account. The service can work with command-line tools, APIs, scripts, Terraform (software), and other infrastructure management tools..

== History ==
IBM Cloud's history traces back to early virtualization efforts in the 1970s and 1980s, but it emerged as a formal, comprehensive cloud service provider in the late 2000s, driven by investments in private cloud and the acquisition of SoftLayer. The strategy shifted significantly toward hybrid cloud in the late 2010s, solidified by the acquisition of Red Hat.

=== SoftLayer ===
SoftLayer Technologies, Inc.
- Type: Subsidiary
- Industry: Hosting
- Founded: 2005
- Founder: Lance Crosby
- Headquarters: Dallas, Texas, USA
- Products: Dedicated Hosting, Managed Services
- Parent: IBM (since 2013)
- ASN: 36351
- Website: softlayer.com

SoftLayer Technologies, Inc. (now IBM Cloud) was a dedicated server, managed hosting, and cloud computing provider, founded in 2005 and acquired by IBM in 2013. SoftLayer initially specialized in hosting workloads for gaming companies and startups, but shifted focus to enterprise workloads after its acquisition.

SoftLayer had bare-metal compute offerings before other large cloud providers such as Amazon Web Services.

SoftLayer has hosted workloads for companies such as The Hartford, WhatsApp, Whirlpool, Daimler, and Macy's.

==== SoftLayer Timeline ====
- 2005: SoftLayer was established in 2005 by Lance Crosby and several of his ex-coworkers.
- August 2010: GI Partners acquired a majority equity stake in SoftLayer in August 2010.
- November 2010: In November of that year it merged the company with The Planet Internet Services, SoftLayer's biggest competitor, and consolidated the customer base under the SoftLayer brand.
- 2011: The company reported hosting more than 81,000 servers for more than 26,000 customers in locations throughout the United States.
- July 2011: The company announced plans for international expansion to Amsterdam and Singapore to add to the existing network of North American-based data centers in Dallas (Texas), San Jose (California), Seattle (Washington), Houston (Texas) and Washington, D.C. Most of these data centers were leased via Digital Realty.

=== Early Foundations (2000s) ===
- 2007: IBM launches the Blue Cloud initiative which was a series of cloud computing technoligies aimed at allowing enterprises to run applications in a decentralized manner.
- 2007: IBM and Google create an Academic Cloud
- 2008: IBM offers its first industry specific cloud services
- 2008: IBM invests nearly $400 million on cloud computing centers in the U.S. and Japan and opens cloud centers in Africa and China
- 2009: IBM introduces its Cloud Computing Services division

=== Expansion and Acquisitions (Early 2010s) ===
- 2011: IBM launches IBM SmartCloud Foundations
- 2012: IBM cloud revenue grows by 80%
- June 2013: IBM announced its acquisition of SoftLayer under undisclosed financial terms, in a deal that according to Reuters could have fetched more than $2 billion, to form an IBM Cloud Services Division. At the time of acquisition, SoftLayer was described as the biggest privately held cloud infrastructure provider (IaaS) in the world.
- May 2015: The company has 23 data centers in 11 different countries.

=== Bluemix (2013–2016) ===
- In June 2013, IBM acquired SoftLayer, a public cloud platform, to serve as the foundation for its IaaS offering.
- Bluemix was announced for public beta in February 2014 after having been developed since early 2013. Bluemix was based on the open source Cloud Foundry project and ran on SoftLayer infrastructure.
- IBM announced the general availability of the Bluemix Platform-as-a-Service (PaaS) offering in July 2014.

By April 2015, Bluemix included a suite of over 100 cloud-based development tools "including social, mobile, security, analytics, database, and IoT (internet of things). Bluemix had grown to 83,000 users in India with growth of approximately 10,000 users each month.

A year after announcement, Bluemix had made little headway in the cloud-computing platform space relative to its competition, and remained substantially behind market leaders Microsoft Azure and Amazon AWS. By August 2016, little had changed in market acceptance of the Bluemix offering. In February 2016, IBM Bluemix includes IBM's Function as a Service (FaaS) system, or Serverless computing offering, that is built using open source from the Apache OpenWhisk incubator project largely credited to IBM for seeding. This system, equivalent to Amazon Lambda, Microsoft Azure Functions, Oracle Cloud Fn or Google Cloud Functions, allows calling of a specific function in response to an event without requiring any resource management from the developer.

=== Re-brand to IBM Cloud (2017) ===
- 2018: Bluemix / SoftLayer was renamed to IBM Cloud.

In May 2017 IBM released Kubernetes support as the IBM Bluemix Container Service, later renamed to the IBM Cloud Kubernetes Service (IKS). IKS was built using the open source Kubernetes project. This system, equivalent to Amazon Web Services EKS, Microsoft Azure AKS, or Google Cloud GKE, aims to provide a platform for automating deployment, scaling, and operations of application containers across clusters of hosts. In October 2017, IBM announced that they would rebrand their cloud as IBM Cloud brand, merging all components, thus retiring the Bluemix and Softlayer brands.

=== Red Hat Acquisition ===
In March 2018, IBM launched an industry first managed Kubernetes service on bare metal. In October 2018, IBM announced its intent to acquire Red Hat, Inc for approximately $34 billion representing IBM's largest acquisition in its history. The acquisition was completed in July 2019. In August 2019, 3 weeks after the close of Red Hat acquisition, IBM launched a managed Red Hat OpenShift on IBM Cloud. IBM stated the acquisition would position the company as "the world's #1 hybrid cloud provider" by combining Red Hat's open source technologies, including Red Hat Enterprise Linux and OpenShift with IBM's existing cloud infrastructure.

The Red Hat acquisition shaped IBM's cloud strategy, with the company focusing on hybrid cloud solutions that allow enterprises to run workloads across on-premises infrastructure, private clouds, and multiple public cloud platforms.

In May 2026, IBM announced the Red Hat OpenShift Virtualization Service on IBM Cloud, a managed virtualization offering designed to run virtual machines on Red Hat OpenShift deployed on IBM Cloud infrastructure. The service is built on Red Hat OpenShift Virtualization technologies including KubeVirt and the KVM hypervisor, and is delivered as an IBM-managed service on IBM Cloud VPC bare metal servers. The offering was positioned to address enterprise demand for alternatives to legacy virtualization platforms, emphasizing operational stability, security, compliance, and predictable costs while allowing organizations to maintain a virtual-machine first approach. IBM stated that the service is intended to provide a long-term path toward containerization and cloud-native application modernization without requiring immediate architectural changes.

=== Financial Services Cloud ===
In November 2019, IBM has announced that it had designed the world's first financial services-ready public cloud and that Bank of America was its first committed collaborator and anchor customer, joined shortly thereafter in 2020 by BNP Paribas as its first European anchor client. IBM announced in April 2021 the general availability of IBM Cloud for Financial Services, including support for Red Hat OpenShift and other cloud-native technologies. In July 2021, it was announced that SAP is onboarding two of its finance and data management solutions to IBM Cloud for Financial Services. In September 2021, it was CaixaBank's turn to boost digital capabilities with IBM Cloud for Financial Services and onboarding to new IBM Cloud Multizone Region in Spain.

=== Customers ===
IBM Cloud has been adopted by organizations operating in regular and data-intensive including financial services, healthcare, telecommunications, and government. The platform is often associated with enterprise, hybrid-cloud, and compliance focused workloads, particularly those requiring compliance, data sovereignty and integration with on-premises systems and Red Hat OpenShift environments.

== Partnerships ==
IBM has held long‑term technology partnerships with organizations in sports and entertainment, where cloud computing, data management, and analytics platforms support large‑scale digital experiences for global audiences.

IBM has maintained a multi‑decade technology partnership with the United States Tennis Association (USTA) to support the digital platforms of the US Open Tennis Championships, including the tournament’s official website and mobile applications, which deliver real‑time match data and analytics to over 14 million fans worldwide.

In 2019, IBM partnered with the USTA to provide new AI-powered tools for the US Open.

In May 2020, IBM announced agreements with six European companies, including Osram and Crédit Mutuel, that use IBM Cloud to access advanced technologies such as AI, blockchain and analytics.

IBM has also collaborated with The Masters Tournament, the annual golf championship held at Augusta National Golf Club, to support digital experiences for the event. The partnership spans several decades and includes cloud‑based systems used to manage tournament data and deliver content through the Masters website and mobile applications.

In motorsport, IBM has entered into a multi‑year partnership with Scuderia Ferrari, under which IBM provides cloud, data, and analytics technologies that support Ferrari’s digital platforms and fan‑facing applications. The collaboration is focused on enhancing digital engagement through cloud‑based services.

== Reviews ==
IBM Cloud continued to be considered a leader in bare-metal in 2020, and distinguished itself by providing over 11 million possible custom configurations with the latest Power, Intel, and AMD CPUs and Nvidia GPUs. IBM has been reviewed on Gartner Peer Insights where it is assessed by enterprise users in the Strategic Cloud Platform Services category. Reviews reflect a range of experiences across industries and use cases, including hybrid cloud deployments and enterprise application workloads.

== Sustainability ==
In 2021, IBM announced it would achieve net zero greenhouse gas emissions by 2030, and has introduced tools such as the IBM Cloud Carbon Calculator to help customers measure and manage the environmental impact of their cloud workloads.
