= AWS Glue =

Serverless computing platform

- Developer(s): Amazon.com
- Initial release: August 2017; 7 years ago
- Operating system: Cross-platform
- Available in: English
- Website: aws.amazon.com/glue/

AWS Glue is an event-driven, serverless computing platform provided by Amazon as a part of Amazon Web Services. It was introduced in August 2017.

== Overview ==
The primary purpose of Glue is to scan other services in the same Virtual Private Cloud (or equivalent accessible network element even if not provided by AWS), particularly S3. The jobs are billed according to compute time, with a minimum count of 1 minute. Glue discovers the source data to store associated meta-data (e.g. the table's schema of field names, types lengths) in the AWS Glue Data Catalog (which is then accessible via AWS console or APIs).

== Languages supported ==
Scala and Python are officially supported as of 2020.

== Catalog interrogation via API ==
The catalog can be read in AWS console (via browser) and via API divided into topics including:

- Database API
- Table API
- Partition API
- Connection API
- User-Defined Function API
- Importing an Athena Catalog to AWS Glue

== See also ==
- Event-driven architecture
- Serverless Framework
- Function as a service
- Google Cloud Functions
- Azure Function
- Oracle Cloud Platform
