= Oracle Fusion =

Oracle Fusion may refer to:

- Oracle Fusion Architecture, a standards-based technology reference blueprint for building applications
- Oracle Fusion Middleware (OFM), the middleware technology stack on which Oracle applications are built using Oracle Fusion Architecture as blueprint
- Oracle Fusion Applications (OFA), Oracle applications built on top of the Oracle Fusion Middleware technology stack using Oracle Fusion Architecture as blueprint
