= IOUG =

The Independent Oracle Users Group (IOUG), now part of the Quest Oracle Community The deal was finalized in May 2019. represents the voice of Oracle technology and database professionals and empowers them to be more productive in their business and careers by:

- Delivering education
- Sharing best practices
- Providing technology direction and networking opportunities

Incorporating the elements of the G.R.E.A.T. strategy, the IOUG empowers Oracle database and development professionals by delivering the highest quality:

- Information
- Education
- Networking
- Advocacy

The IOUG helps each member:

- Enhance their skill set with technical content created for users by users
- Increase the technical advantage of their organization
- Boost their individual marketability
- Gain access to a network of peers for collaboration and information exchange
- Voice opinions to Oracle about their products, services and policies

This is one of many Oracle User Groups formed as a self-supporting forum for discussion, education and networking outside of the formal Oracle Corporation-sponsored community forums on the Oracle TechNet Discussion Forums.

== History ==
The IOUG was founded in 1993.

Effective 17 September 2005, IOUG changed their name from International Oracle Users Group to the Independent Oracle Users Group.

The last IOUG LIVE conference was hosted in 2005. Starting from 2006, IOUG has jointly participated in the Collaborate unified conference with OAUG and Quest Oracle Community.

In March 2019, it was announced that the IOUG will be joining the Quest Oracle Community. The deal was finalized in May 2019.

== Related Affiliates ==
- Quest Oracle Community - a 55,000+ international community for Oracle's JD Edwards, PeopleSoft, Cloud Applications, Database & Technology users
- Oracle Applications & Technology Users Group (OATUG) - the user community that provides support for Oracle applications & technology users (formerly OAUG)
- Oracle Developer Tools Users Group (ODTUG) - the user community of developers supporting creation of applications and toolsets for use with Oracle application and database technology
- United Kingdom Oracle Users Group (UKOUG) - formed to support the UK and adjacent Oracle user communities in Western Europe
