= List of University of Northern Iowa people =

This list includes notable alumni, faculty, and staff of what is now the University of Northern Iowa.

== Alumni ==
- Bess Streeter Aldrich, novelist
- Terry Allen, former Missouri State head football coach
- Eddie Berlin, former NFL player
- Bruce Charlesworth, filmmaker and photographer
- John R. Dinger, former U.S. ambassador to Mongolia (2000–2003)
- Jane Elliot, social activist
- Paul Emerick, professional rugby player and three-time Rugby World Cup veteran
- Ali Farokhmanesh, former professional basketball player, made famous shot to beat Kansas
- LJ Fort, Pittsburgh Steelers linebacker
- Joe Fuller, former NFL player
- Mike Furrey, former NFL player
- Charles Grassley, current U.S. senator
- Gil Gutknecht, former U.S. congressman
- Ryan Hannam, former NFL player
- Mike Hawker, Alaska state representative, 2002–present
- Robert John Hibbs, Medal of Honor recipient, 1966, Vietnam War
- Roger Jepsen, former U.S. senator
- David Johnson, NFL running back for the Arizona Cardinals
- Chris Klieman, head coach of Kansas State University football
- Bonnie Koloc, vocalist, recording artist
- Pamela Levy, American-Israeli artist
- Jason Lewis, nationally syndicated talk host
- Greg McDermott, current Creighton University head men's basketball coach
- C. Edward McVaney, co-founder and former CEO of the JD Edwards Corporation, an enterprise resource planning company purchased by PeopleSoft in 2002
- Brad Meester, former NFL player
- Brian Meyer, member of the Iowa House of Representatives
- Abinadi Meza, performance artist
- Brian Mitchell, arena football drop kick record holder
- Nick Nurse, basketball coach
- Bryce Paup, 1995 NFL Defensive Player of the Year, 4-time Pro Bowler
- Tom Pettit, television news correspondent for NBC
- Chris Pirillo, former host of TechTV's Call for Help show, founder of Lockergnome
- Nancy Jo Powell, current United States ambassador to India; former U.S. ambassador to Nepal, Pakistan, Ghana and Uganda
- Steve Proffitt, senior producer, National Public Radio
- Dorothy Jean Ray, anthropologist
- William P. Robinson, president of Whitworth University
- Dean Schwarz, ceramic artist
- Warren Allen Smith, writer
- Mary Ellen Solt, poet
- Phyllis Somerville, film, theatre and television actress
- Mark Steines, co-host of Entertainment Tonight
- Bill Stewart, jazz musician
- Tyree Talton, former NFL player
- Ed Thomas, high school football coach
- Krista Voda, NASCAR on Fox announcer
- Kurt Warner, two-time NFL MVP, MVP of Super Bowl XXXIV
- Joey Woody, national champion US hurdler

=== Notable faculty ===
- Donna Alvermann, former professor of education, now distinguished professor and researcher in education at the University of Georgia
- Jeremy Beck, composer, associate professor of Composition & Theory (1992–1998)
- Herb Hake, television personality
- James Hearst, poet and former professor
- Miguel Franz Pinto, vocal coach, conductor, and pianist
- Loree Rackstraw, literary critic and memoirist
- Leland Sage, former professor
- Norm Stewart, former men's basketball coach who went on to become a coach at the University of Missouri
- Robert James Waller, alumnus, former professor and dean of College of Businesses Administration, author of The Bridges of Madison County
