= Oracle Applications =

Enterprise software suite

Oracle Applications comprise the applications software or business software of the Oracle Corporation both in the cloud and on-premises. The term refers to the non-database and non-middleware parts. The suite of applications includes enterprise resource planning, enterprise performance management, supply chain & manufacturing, human capital management, and advertising and customer experience.

== History ==
Oracle Corporation began selling applications—software running on its Oracle Database—in the late 1980s. By 2007 they had helped Oracle become the world's largest enterprise software vendor. By 2009, Oracle applications extended to supply chain management, human-resource management, warehouse-management, customer-relationship management, call-center services, product-lifecycle management, and many other areas. Both in-house expansion and the acquisition of other companies have vastly expanded Oracle's application software business.

In February 2007, Oracle released Oracle E-Business Suite (EBS/e-BS) Release 12 (R12) – a bundling of several Oracle Applications. The release date coincided with new releases of other Oracle-owned products: JD Edwards EnterpriseOne, Siebel Systems and PeopleSoft.

Oracle also has a portfolio of enterprise applications for the cloud (SaaS) known as Oracle Fusion Cloud Applications. These cloud applications include Oracle Cloud ERP, Oracle Cloud EPM, Oracle Cloud HCM, Oracle Cloud SCM, and Oracle Advertising and CX.

== Cloud applications ==
Oracle provides SaaS applications also known as Oracle Fusion Cloud Applications. The following enterprise cloud applications are available on Oracle Cloud.

- Oracle Enterprise Resource Planning (ERP) Cloud
- Oracle Enterprise Performance Management (EPM) Cloud
- Oracle Human Capital Management (HCM) Cloud
- Oracle Supply Chain Management (SCM) Cloud
- Oracle Advertising and Customer Experience (CX) Cloud

=== Oracle Enterprise Resource Planning (ERP) ===
Oracle Cloud ERP is a cloud-based ERP software application suite that manages enterprise functions including accounting, financial management, project management, and procurement.

=== Oracle Enterprise Performance Management (EPM) ===
Oracle Cloud EPM is a cloud-based EPM software application suite that manages enterprise operational processes including planning, budgeting, and reporting.

=== Oracle Human Capital Management (HCM) ===
Oracle Cloud HCM is a cloud-based HCM software application suite that manages global HR, talent, and workforce management. Oracle Cloud HCM was released in 2011 as a part of Oracle Fusion Applications.

=== Oracle Supply Chain Management (SCM) ===
Oracle Cloud SCM, also known as Oracle Supply Chain & Manufacturing, is a cloud-based SCM software application suite used by companies to build and manage intelligent supply chains. This includes support for procurement, order management, manufacturing, product lifecycle management, maintenance, logistics, and supply chain planning and execution.

=== Oracle Advertising and Customer Experience (CX) ===
Oracle Advertising and Customer Experience (CX) is a cloud-based application suite that includes tools for advertising, marketing, sales, e-commerce, and customer service. The suite also includes:

- Oracle CX (with Oracle Sales, Oracle Service, Oracle Marketing, Oracle Commerce)
- Oracle Advertising (with Oracle Activation and Oracle MOAT Measurement)

== Industry vertical applications ==
- ATG / Endeca—also branded as on-premises "Oracle Commerce"
- Oracle Retail
- Micros (Retail and Hospitality, acquired post 2012)
- Primavera
- Agile
- AutoVue (for processing CAD and graphics data)

== NetSuite ==
Acquired by Oracle in 2016, NetSuite is a cloud-based enterprise software company that provides products and services tailored for small and medium-sized businesses (SMBs). This includes support for accounting and financial management, customer relationship management, inventory management, human capital management, payroll, procurement, project management and e-commerce. In 2019, NetSuite moved onto Oracle Cloud.

== On-premises applications ==
- Oracle E-Business Suite
- Oracle PeopleSoft
- Oracle Siebel CRM
- Oracle JD Edwards EnterpriseOne
- Oracle JD Edwards World
- Endeca
- Inquira
- Silver Creek
- Datanomic
- Hyperion
- Campus Solutions

Oracle's E-Business Suite (also known as EB-Suite/EBS, eBus or "E-Biz") consists of a collection of enterprise resource planning (ERP), customer relationship management (CRM), human capital management (HCM), and supply-chain management (SCM) computer applications either developed or acquired by Oracle. The software utilizes Oracle's core database technology. The E-Business Suite contains several product lines often known by short acronyms.

Significant technologies incorporated into the applications include the Oracle database technologies (engines for RDBMS, PL/SQL, Java, .NET, HTML and XML) and the "technology stack" (Oracle Forms Server, Oracle Reports Server, Apache Web Server, Oracle Discoverer, Jinitiator and Sun's Java).

It makes the following enterprise applications available as part of Oracle eBusiness Suite:

- Asset Lifecycle Management
- Customer Relationship Management (CRM)
- Enterprise Resource Planning (ERP)
- Human Capital Management (HCM)
- Procurement
- Product Life-cycle Management
- Supply Chain Management
- Manufacturing

== See also ==
- CEMLI
- List of acquisitions by Oracle (includes acquisitions which extended Applications portfolio)
- Oracle Fusion Applications
