= Oracle Identity Management =

Oracle Identity Management, a software suite marketed by Oracle Corporation, provides identity and access management (IAM) technologies.

The name of the software suite closely resembles the name of one of its components, Oracle Identity Manager.

== Components ==
Product	Software Stack	Description	Original name	Notes
Oracle Internet Directory (OID)	OIM	An LDAP directory server that stores its data in an Oracle database.		Following its acquisition of Sun Microsystems, Oracle Corporation maintains both Oracle Internet Directory and the Sun Directory Server Enterprise Edition (renamed to Oracle Directory Server Enterprise Edition) as strategic LDAP directory server products.
Directory Integration Platform (DIP)	OIM/OID	A directory synchronization and provisioning framework included in OID. Supports synchronization of data between heterogeneous systems, include multiple vendor LDAPs, databases, flat files and Oracle eBusiness Suite HRMS.		
Oracle Authentication Services for Operating Systems (OAS4OS)	OIM/OID	A product that configures Linux/Unix systems to authenticate against OID via PAM/NSS, etc.		
Oracle Directory Server Enterprise Edition	OIM	An LDAP directory server.	Sun DSEE	Following its acquisition of Sun Microsystems, Oracle Corporation maintains both Oracle Internet Directory and the Sun Directory Server Enterprise Edition (renamed to Oracle Directory Server Enterprise Edition) as strategic LDAP directory server products.
Oracle Unified Directory (OUD)	OIM	An LDAP directory server including proxy.	Sun OpenDS	Java-based Directory Server including proxy, synchronization and virtualization capabilities.
Oracle Virtual Directory (OVD)	OIM	A directory virtualization solution that combines information from multiple LDAP directories and presents them as a single directory and single schema.	OctetString VDE	
Oracle Access Manager (OAM)	OIM	Oracle's strategic solution for access management and web single sign-on.	Oblix CoreID	The 10g version was written in C; in the 11g version, the server itself has been rewritten in Java, although some of the integration components (web gates) are still written in C. The Sun Secure Token Service was added to the Oracle Access Management Suite following the Sun acquisition.
Oracle OpenSSO	OIM	Access management.	Sun OpenSSO Enterprise	Oracle Access Manager (OAM) is the strategic product.
Oracle Single Sign-On (OSSO)	OIM	Oracle's legacy single sign-on (SSO) solution.		As of 11g, the server component of SSO has been discontinued, but the Apache module (mod_osso) is still provided, with OAM 11g able to interoperate with mod_osso. OSSO is focused on integrating with Oracle products, and has more limited support for integrating with products from third-party vendors than OAM.
Oracle Identity Federation (OIF)	OIM	An identity federation solution, supporting SAML and Liberty protocols for federated single sign-on.		Formerly an Oblix product, combined with Sun Fedlet following the Sun acquisition.
Oracle Adaptive Access Manager (OAAM)	OIM	Provides fraud detection and countermeasures including strong authentication.		From the Bharosa acquisition.
Oracle Role Manager (ORM)	N/A	Provides role management. (product discontinued)		From the Bridgestream acquisition. Discontinued in favor of Oracle Identity Analytics (OIA) post-Sun acquisition.
Oracle Identity Analytics (OIA)	OIM	Provides role mining, compliance attestation/recertification, and dashboards and reports for identity analytics.	Sun Java System Role Manager	Replaces the former Oracle Role Manager (ORM) component.
Oracle Identity Manager (OIM)	OIM	Provides provisioning, reconciliation, request-based provisioning, self-service, and integration with heterogenous identity systems through connectors (LDAP, operating systems, mainframe/midrange, ERP packages, email/collaboration suites, databases, etc.).	Thor Xellerate	From the Thor Technologies (Thortech) acquisition (2005). The name of this component closely resembles the name of the software suite as a whole.
Oracle Waveset	OIM	Similar features as Oracle Identity Manager (OIM).	Sun Identity Manager	Oracle Corporation continues to maintain this product, but with Oracle Identity Manager as the strategic product. Sun Identity Manager was renamed to Oracle Waveset to avoid confusion, which is actually a reversion to the original name from before Sun acquired Waveset Technologies. Waveset also incorporates connectors and adapters for interfacing to heterogenous systems, similar in principle to those included in Oracle Identity Manager.
Oracle Certificate Authority (OCA)	N/A	An X.509 certificate authority. (product discontinued)		This component has been discontinued in the 11g release with no replacement.
Oracle Enterprise Single Sign-On (eSSO)	OIM	This provides desktop-based single sign-on (SSO), including support for retrofitting single sign-on into legacy fat client applications via automated login form fill-in, and doing the same for web and 3270-based applications.		This was originally OEM-ed from Passlogix, although Passlogix has now been acquired by Oracle.
Oracle Entitlements Server (OES)	OIM	Provides centralized management of security policies, expressible in XACML. Disparate applications can use OES to provide a common framework for managing access control policies.		Originally a BEA Systems product.
Oracle Security Developer Tools (OSDT)	OIM	A library providing implementations of encryption algorithms, XML security, etc., for use by application programmers.		
Oracle Applications Access Control Governor (OAACG)	Applications	Provides segregation of duties (SOD) functionalities for Oracle eBusiness Suite and PeopleSoft. The relevant OIM connectors call out to OAACG to ensure the SOD policies are enforced via the SIL (SOD Invocation Library). SIL also supports interfacing with SAP Virsa to perform SOD for SAP systems, and is extensible to integrate OIM with arbitrary SOD frameworks.		
Oracle Web Services Manager (OWSM)	SOA Suite	Provides web-services security, including the WS-Security protocol.		This is part of the Oracle SOA Suite rather than the Identity Management stack, but overlaps with a number of areas of identity management.
Oracle Information Rights Management (Oracle IRM)	Content Management	Provides for the securing and tracking of sensitive digital information wherever it is stored and used.		This is part of the Oracle Content Management suite (from the Stellent acquisition) rather than the Identity Management stack, but overlaps with a number of areas of identity management.

== Sun rebranding ==
After Oracle acquired Sun Microsystems, they re-branded a number of products that overlapped in function. (See table below.) The re-branding, and Oracle's commitment to ongoing support and maintenance of these products were revealed by Hasan Rizvi, Senior Vice President of Oracle Fusion Middleware in an Oracle and Sun Identity Management Strategy webcast in 2010.

Old Name	New Name
Sun Directory Server Enterprise Edition	Oracle Directory Server Enterprise Edition
Sun OpenDS	Oracle Unified Directory
Sun Role Manager	Oracle Identity Analytics
Sun Identity Manager	Oracle Waveset
Sun OpenSSO Enterprise	Oracle OpenSSO

== Other information ==
Originally, in the 10g and earlier versions, the Java-based portions of the suite ran mainly on OC4J, although some components (e.g. OIM) supported other J2EE appservers. For the 11g version, Oracle Corporation ported the OC4J-based components to WebLogic.

As of November 2008 the software was undergoing Common Criteria evaluation process.

In March 2005 Oracle acquired Oblix and incorporated their web access control software into Oracle Identity Management.

== See also ==
- Oracle Directory Server Enterprise Edition
- Oracle Internet Directory
- Oracle Technology Network
- Oracle Fusion Middleware
