= Oracle Cloud Platform =

Platform as a Service

- Company type: Public
- Industry: Cloud computing
- Founder: Larry Ellison; Bob Miner; Ed Oates
- Headquarters: Austin, Texas, United States
- Area served: Worldwide
- Products: Platform as a service
- Website: www.oracle.com/cloud

Oracle Cloud Platform refers to a Platform as a Service (PaaS) offerings by Oracle Corporation as part of Oracle Cloud Infrastructure. These offerings are used to build, deploy, integrate and extend applications in the cloud. The offerings support a variety of programming languages, databases, tools and frameworks including Oracle-specific, open source and third-party software and systems.

== Deployment models ==
Oracle Cloud Platform offers public, private and hybrid cloud deployment models.

== Architecture ==
Oracle Cloud Platform provides both Infrastructure as a Service (IaaS) and Platform as a Service (PaaS). The infrastructure is offered through a global network of Oracle managed data centers. Oracle deploys their cloud in Regions. Inside each Region are at least three fault-independent Availability Domains. Each of these Availability Domains contains an independent data center with power, thermal and network isolation. Oracle Cloud is generally available in North America, EMEA, APAC and Japan with announced South America and US Govt. regions coming soon.

== See also ==
- Platform as a service
- Oracle Cloud (including Oracle Cloud Infrastructure)
- Oracle Advertising and Customer Experience (CX)
- Oracle Cloud Enterprise Resource Planning (ERP)
- Oracle Cloud Human Capital Management (HCM)
- Oracle Cloud Supply Chain Management (SCM)
