= Oracle User Group =

An Oracle User Group is a private, generally non-profit or not-for-profit organization that provides support and education for users of Oracle Corporation technology, particularly for professional users, however student user groups have also been established.

The Oracle user groups often hold conferences, publish periodicals and survey members to provide real data back to Oracle.

== International Oracle User Council ==
The International Oracle User Council (IOUC) is an international organization represents the collective interests of the affiliated Oracle user groups.

The Quest Oracle Community supports JD Edwards, PeopleSoft and Oracle Cloud users.
