= Serverless Framework =

Framework for web, mobile and IoT applications with serverless architectures

Serverless
- Original author: Austen Collins
- Initial release: October 2015; 10 years ago
- Stable release: 4.28.0 / 11 December 2025; 57 days ago
- Repository: github.com/serverless/serverless
- Written in: Node.js
- Operating system: Cross-platform
- Website: www.serverless.com

The Serverless Framework is a web framework written using Node.js. Serverless is the first framework developed for building applications on AWS Lambda, a serverless computing platform provided by Amazon as a part of Amazon Web Services. Currently, applications developed with Serverless can be deployed to other function as a service providers, including Microsoft Azure with Azure Functions, IBM Bluemix with IBM Cloud Functions based on Apache OpenWhisk, Google Cloud using Google Cloud Functions, Oracle Cloud using Oracle Fn, Kubeless based on Kubernetes, Spotinst and Webtask by Auth0.

A Serverless app can simply be a couple of lambda functions to accomplish some tasks, or an entire back-end composed of hundreds of lambda functions. Serverless supports all runtimes offered within the cloud provider chosen. Serverless is developed by Austen Collins and maintained by a full-time team.

It was first introduced in October 2015 under the name JAWS.
