= PeopleTools =

Proprietary integrated development environment

PeopleSoft Enterprise PeopleTools
- Original author: PeopleSoft
- Developer: Oracle Corporation
- Stable release: 8.63 / October 21, 2026; 0 days' time
- Written in: C++, Java
- Operating system: Windows, Linux
- Platform: x64
- Type: Integrated development environment
- License: Proprietary commercial software
- Website: Official Page

PeopleTools consists of proprietary application software originally developed by PeopleSoft Corporation, an Enterprise Resource Planning (ERP) software vendor acquired by Oracle Corporation in 2004. PeopleTools facilitates the deployment of both vendor-developed and custom-developed applications using an Internet-based architecture known as the PeopleSoft Internet Architecture (PIA).

Core vendor-developed PeopleTools applications include:

- Financials and Supply Chain Management (FSCM)
- Human Capital Management (HCM)
- Campus Solutions (CS)
- Customer Relationship Management (CRM)
- Enterprise Performance Management (EPM)

As a result of the high level of abstraction used in PeopleTools, these applications can run in association with a variety of operating systems and databases and can provide multilingual support on a variety of web browsers.

From a development perspective, PeopleTools consists of several technologies for building and customizing applications. While a PeopleTools developer can (and often does) work with many programming languages, the primary language is PeopleCode, and Application Designer is the primary integrated development environment (IDE).

== PIA ==
The PIA (PeopleSoft / PeopleTools Internet Architecture) consists of a variety components including: web, application, search, database, and process scheduler servers as well as Integration Broker. These components can be deployed on a single real or virtual server but are most typically deployed in isolation for reasons of performance and scalability.

Web Server

Like traditional web-based applications, web servers are used within the PIA to provide HTML-based documents for browser-based clients. Supported web server options have changed over time, and as of PeopleTools 8.59, PeopleTools applications are deployed only using Oracle WebLogic Server. Unlike traditional web-based applications, the Java-based software deployed in the web servers contains no application logic, purely presentation logic.

In the PIA, all application logic is deployed at the application server layer.

Application Server

The application server, or “app server,” is the tier between the web and database layers. This layer is primarily responsible for receiving requests from the web server and issuing SQL to the database.

The app server is built on BEA Tuxedo technology, and as such, is responsible for maintaining transaction isolation and database connection pools in PeopleTools applications. Using Tuxedo, PeopleTools app server domains are created as a collection of processes servicing specific needs and clients in addition to web server requests. Within a domain, several types of related programs can be launched, including remote call COBOL, Application Engine, and BI Publisher programs.

Process Scheduler Server

Like the app server, the process scheduler server, or "scheduler" or "batch server" is built on BEA Tuxedo and is deployed as a collection of processes designed to launch and schedule various programs types. Such processes form a process scheduler domain and are used to execute COBOL, SQR, Crystal Reports, Application Engine, nVision, BI Publisher, and many other types of batch programs. Unlike the app server, the scheduler does not return HTML to the web server for delivery to the client browser. Rather, the scheduler simply executes programs and posts logs and reports to the web server for user retrieval.

Database Server

The database server contains all application data as well as all metadata associated with various PeopleTools object types. It also contains many PeopleCode-based application scripts and programs that both the application and process scheduler servers execute.

As PeopleTools is built to operate on many database platforms, database specific constructs (like stored procedures) and programming languages (like PL/SQL) are not traditionally used. Alternatively, developers write Meta-SQL, and the app or scheduler servers translate such into the proprietary SQL for the related database technology.

Search Server

Based on predefined search indexes, the search server returns search results for consumption in the client's web browser. For 9.2 applications running PeopleTools 8.62, the search server technology is a forked version of the Elastic stack.

Integration Broker

Integration Broker is another major server component of PeopleTools. Making use of the PIA web and app servers, Integration Broker sends and receives data via web service-based APIs. While adhering to standards-based web service standards - such as XML-based SOAP and JSON-based RESTful web services - Integration Broker also provides a simple proprietary XML-based standard (known as PSCAMA) for PeopleTools-based applications to exchange data both synchronously and asynchronously.

== Application Designer ==
Application Designer is the core tool used to create and customize PeopleTools-based applications. This tool is used to either connect to the database or app server for the purposes of creating and updating PeopleTools object types. The following is a brief list of such object types created or modified in Application Designer:

- Field Definition
- Record Definition
- PeopleCode
- Page definition
- Page Group (component) definition
- Menu Definition
- Business Process design (workflow)
- Project definition

Applications can be built or customised in a development environment, then assembled into a project for migration to test and live environments.

== Current and Future releases ==
Current computing trends have led to the introduction of the Fluid User Interface (UI) in PeopleTools 8.54.

Fluid UI technology is used by PeopleTools developers to create responsive applications. Oracle has announced updates to application pages using this technology in PeopleTools 8.55.

== Major Versions and General Availability (GA) Dates ==
- 8.63 - 29 Jul 2026 for Oracle Cloud only (OCI), 21 Oct 2026 for true GA
- 8.62 - 28 Apr 2025 for Oracle Cloud only (OCI), 14 Jul 2025 for true GA
- 8.61 - 17 Jan 2024 for Oracle Cloud only (OCI), 15 Apr 2024 for true GA
- 8.60 - 15 Oct 2022 for Oracle Cloud only (OCI), 2 Dec 2022 for true GA
- 8.59 - 8 April 2021 for Oracle Cloud only, 22 July 2021 for true GA
- 8.58 - 19 December 2019
- 8.57 - 21 September 2018
- 8.56 - 6 June 2017
- 8.55 - 4 December 2015
- 8.54 - 11 July 2014
- 8.53 - 6 February 2013
- 8.52 - 28 October 2011
- 8.51 - 10 September 2010
- 8.50 - 18 September 2009
- 8.49 - 25 April 2007
- 8.48 - 13 July 2006
- 8.47 - 15 November 2005
- 8.46 - 23 February 2005
- 8.45 - 9 June 2004
- 8.44 - 17 December 2003
- 8.43 - 13 June 2003
- 8.42 - 26 November 2002
- 8.41 -
- 8.40 -
- 8.20 - 22 August 2003
- 8.15 - 31 August 2001
- 8.14 - 15 June 2001
- 7.61 - 6 April 2001
- 7.1x
