= Quest Oracle Community =

Not-for-profit organization

Quest Oracle Community (formerly Quest International Users Group) is a not-for-profit organization dedicated to supporting users of JD Edwards, PeopleSoft, and Oracle Cloud applications. It is an Oracle User Group.

It is part of the International Oracle User Group Community which also includes the Oracle Applications Users Group (OAUG) and the Independent Oracle Users Group (IOUG).

Quest International Users Group was formed in 1995 with the blessings and support of Ed McVaney, one of the founders of JD Edwards. The goal was to provide users a community to not only vent their frustrations but to also provide candid feedback for improving JDE products. JD Edwards was acquired by PeopleSoft in 2003, and in 2005 Oracle acquired PeopleSoft. Since Oracle supported a user-group model with organizations such as OAUG and IOUG, Quest became an entity on par with OAUG and IOUG under the banner of the International Oracle User Group Community (IOUC).

Quest is one of the three sponsors, along with IOUG and OAUG, of the yearly conference COLLABORATE.

In July 2018, Quest changed its name from Quest International Users Group to Quest Oracle Community.

In March 2019, Quest announced that the IOUG would be joining the Quest Oracle Community. The deal was finalized in May 2019.
