= Oracle Cloud Enterprise Resource Planning =

Cloud-based service

Oracle Enterprise Resource Planning Cloud
- Developer: Oracle Corporation
- Release: June 2012; 14 years ago
- Stable release: 25C
- Written in: Java
- Operating system: Windows, macOS, Linux, Unix
- Platform: Cross-platform (Cloud)
- Predecessor: Oracle EBS
- Available in: Multi-lingual (28 Languages supported)
- Type: Enterprise resource planning
- License: Commercial, Proprietary
- Website: www.oracle.com/applications/erp/

Oracle Cloud Enterprise Resource Planning is a cloud-based ERP software application suite introduced by Oracle Corporation in 2012. Oracle ERP Cloud manages enterprise functions including accounting, financial management, project management, procurement, human capital management, supply chain and manufacturing, and customer experience. According to Gartner, Oracle ERP is a recognized leader in ERP software.

== Product ==
Oracle Cloud ERP is an end-to-end Software as a Service suite that manages enterprise operations. The suite runs on an Oracle technology stack in Oracle's cloud centers. Oracle Cloud ERP is accessible through both public and private cloud implementations and supports hybrid deployment. Oracle supplies updates to Oracle ERP Cloud on a quarterly basis. According to the company's website, there are nine different software modules that make up the Oracle Cloud ERP suite, namely:

- Financials
- Accounting Hub
- Procurement
- Project Management
- Risk Management
- Enterprise Performance Management (EPM)
- Human Capital Management
- AI Apps for ERP
- Oracle AI Agent Studio
- Supply Chain Management (SCM)
- Manufacturing
- Customer Experience
- Reporting and Analytics
- NetSuite

The software suite is designed to support international enterprise functions and includes multi-GAAP, multi-currency, multi-language, and multi-subsidiary capabilities.

== History ==
Oracle Cloud ERP was based originally on Oracle Fusion Applications, Oracle's enterprise resource planning software suite developed for Oracle Fusion Architecture and Oracle Fusion Middleware released in 2011. In June 2012, Oracle CTO and chairman of the board Larry Ellison announced the Oracle Cloud ERP application suite as a part of Oracle Cloud, the company's broad set of cloud-based applications. Oracle announced preview availability of Oracle Cloud ERP at Oracle OpenWorld 2012. In October 2015, the company reported that Oracle ERP Cloud had surpassed 1,300 customers. On August 2, 2017, Oracle announced Release 13 of Oracle Cloud ERP.

In 2017, Oracle CEO Safra Catz announced the availability of Oracle Cloud ERP in India to assist the country in preparation of its Goods and Services tax reforms.

In March 2017, Oracle reported that Oracle Cloud ERP had grown 280% in fiscal quarter 3.

In September 2017, it was reported Oracle's cloud ERP business grew 156% in first quarter 2017–18 and had reached an annual run rate of $1.2 billion.

In June 2025, it was reported that Oracle's Fusion Cloud ERP revenue grew for the fiscal year 2025 grew to $3.7 billion in USD and constant currency.

== Regions ==
Oracle ERP Cloud is available in Global Regions such as: North America, South America, Asia and EMEA regions.

== Certifications ==
Oracle offers certifications in Software as a Service (SaaS) specializations for Oracle ERP Cloud.

Oracle Financials Cloud

- Oracle Accounting Hub Cloud 2017 Certified Implementation Specialist
- Oracle Financials Cloud: General Ledger 2017 Certified Implementation Specialist
- Oracle Financials Cloud: Payables 2017 Certified Implementation Specialist
- Oracle Financials Cloud: Receivables 2017 Certified Implementation Specialist
- Oracle Revenue Management Cloud Service 2017 Certified Implementation Specialist

Oracle Procurement Cloud

- Oracle Procurement Cloud 2017 Certified Implementation Specialist

Oracle Project Portfolio Management Cloud

- Oracle Project Portfolio Management Cloud 2017 Certified Implementation Specialist

Oracle Risk Management Cloud

- Oracle Financial Reporting Compliance Cloud 2017 Certified Implementation Specialist

== Notable customers & partnerships ==
- Bank of America
- Thomson Reuters
- Qantas
- Blue Shield of California
- Office for National Statistics
- Hearst
- Wake Forest Baptist Medical Center
- Health Care Service Corporation
- Carbon
- HM Treasury
- PrimeQ
- Caesar Entertainment

=== Academic institutions ===
- The College of New Jersey
- Shawnee State University
- Birmingham City University
- University of Wyoming
- Boise State University
- University of Kansas
- Vanderbilt University
- San Bernardino Community College

== Events ==
=== Oracle CloudWorld ===
Oracle CloudWorld (formerly Oracle OpenWorld is an annual technology conference hosted by Oracle and has featured announcements of updates to Oracle ERP Cloud. Currently Oracle CloudWorld is hosted in Las Vegas

=== COLLABORATE ===
COLLABORATE is an annual technology forum hosted by independent Oracle users groups, including the International Oracle Users Group (IOUG), the Oracle Applications Users Group (OAUG), and Quest Oracle Community, that provides training for Oracle products including Oracle ERP Cloud.

== See also ==
- Enterprise software
