= Jinitiator =

Java virtual machine

- Developer: Oracle Corporation
- Operating system: Microsoft Windows
- Website: Oracle Jinitiator

Jinitiator is a Java virtual machine (JVM) made and distributed by Oracle Corporation. It allows a web enabled Oracle Forms client application to be run inside a web browser. This JVM is called only when a web-based Oracle application is accessed. This behavior is implemented by a plugin or an activex control, depending on the browser.

The first two numbers of the version roughly follow the Sun Java numbering convention. It means that for instance Jinitiator 1.3.1.25 is based upon JDK 1.3 or later.

The main reason for Oracle to develop Jinitiator was to support Oracle Forms on the web in earlier releases due to bugs in earlier releases of the JDK.

In 2007 Oracle announced, that for the upcoming release of Forms version 11, Jinitiator would no longer be needed and that users should migrate to the Sun Java plug-in. In January 2010, a product obsolescence desupport notice was posted saying that JInitiator would no longer be supported and that all users should upgrade. Since version 10.1.2.0.2 of Forms in 2010, Oracle began working closely with Sun to completely phase out Jinitiator.

The latest version (released in 2008) is 1.3.1.30 and is still available at the Oracle website. Obsolete versions of Jinitiator can be made to work under Windows 7 with Internet Explorer 9, but this approach is not supported or recommended by Oracle.
