= CEMLI =

CEMLI (Configuration, Extension, Modification, Localization, and Integration) is an ERP software extension framework provided in Oracle Applications by Oracle Corporation. CEMLI is Oracle's published guidelines for developing and implementing custom extensions to Oracle Applications.

They are used to improve flexibility and extra functionality not available in the standard product. CEMLI stands for Configuration, Extension, Modification, Localization, and Integration Framework. There are (at least) 19 categories of extensions that any client can choose from, to enhance their Oracle system.

== Background ==
Initially the acronym CEMLI was used by Oracle On Demand (EBS Hosting) to classify and evaluate the impact when a customized EBS solution shall be overtaken into hosting mode. On Demand has defined restrictive rules how a customization has to be implemented and which documentation has to be provided. In addition to On Demand, in between also Oracle Development, the Consulting organization and Oracle's Unified Method (OUM) has adapted the acronym CEMLI, and is using it in offers and implementation projects.

== Best practice ==
On top of the On Demand rules, Oracle Consulting has specified further criteria and best practice how to create custom code. The challenge here is to avoid modifications, although custom code shall be tightly integrated and not "visible" as custom code to the end users (same behavior as standard functionality). There are a number of techniques and procedures to implement CEMLIs in a most appropriate and safe way, such as Descriptive Flex fields (DFF), Forms Folders, Workflows, Forms and Framework (OAF) Personalization's, BI Publisher Reports, Business Events and User Hooks. Using one of these techniques allows to plug in additional functionality without modifying existing EBS standard code.
