= Oracle Identity Manager =

Oracle Identity Manager (OIM) is an identity management system developed by Oracle Corporation that enables enterprises to manage the entire user life-cycle across all enterprise resources both within and beyond a firewall. Within Oracle Identity Management it provides a mechanism for implementing the user-management aspects of a corporate policy. It can also audit users and their access privileges.

== Versions ==
OIM has evolved based on the needs of enterprise users. It was earlier a Thor Technologies product - after Oracle Corporation acquired Thor (2005), OIM 9i was released. OIM 9i was based on the Struts framework.

Later Oracle Corporation released OIM 11olg R1 based on Oracle Application Developmental Framework. In July 2012 Oracle released OIM 11g R2

== Components ==
- IT Resource Type Def: used to define the connection details of a target system.
- IT Resource: stores actual connection data. (Password is always encrypted.)
- Resource Object: the logical representation of the target system.
- Process Definition: defines the flow of actual tasks.
- Process Form: table within OIM database to hold data for a given resource object.
- Process Task: different task associated with a target system.

There are five different types of adapters used for different tasks as listed below:

1. Process Task Adapter
2. Pre Populate Adapter
3. Task Assignment Adapter
4. Rule Generator Adapter
5. Entity Adapter
