= Oracle Fusion Architecture =

Software architecture

Oracle Fusion Architecture is a technology reference architecture or blueprint from Oracle Corporation for building applications. Oracle Fusion Applications is built on top of the Oracle Fusion Middleware technology stack using Oracle's Fusion Architecture as blueprint.

Oracle Fusion Architecture is not a product, and can be used without licensing it from Oracle.

== Details ==
Oracle Fusion Architecture provides an open architecture ecosystem, which is service- and event-enabled. Many enterprises use this open, pluggable architecture ecosystem to write Oracle Fusion Applications, or even third-party applications on top of Oracle Fusion Middleware.

Oracle Fusion Architecture is based on the following core principles:

- Model Driven: For applications, business processes and business information
- Service & Event- enabled: For extensible, modular, flexible applications and processes
- Information Centric: For complete and consistent, actionable, real-time intelligence
- Grid-Ready: Must be scalable, available, secure, manageable on low-cost hardware
- Standards-based: Must be open, pluggable in a heterogeneous environment

Oracle Fusion Applications that can be written on Oracle Fusion Middleware using the Oracle Fusion Architecture ecosystem, were released in September, 2010.

== See also ==
- Oracle Fusion Middleware
- Oracle Fusion Applications
- Interface (computing)
- Enterprise service bus
- Fusion CRM
