= Oracle Cloud HCM =

Cloud-based human resource management service

- Developer: Oracle Corporation
- Release: October 2011
- Stable release: 21D / October 2021
- Type: Human capital management software, Human resources management, Payroll
- License: Proprietary
- Website: https://www.oracle.com/human-capital-management/

Oracle Cloud Human Capital Management (Oracle Cloud HCM) is a cloud-based HCM software application suite for global HR, talent, and workforce management released by Oracle Corporation in 2011.

== History ==
Oracle Cloud HCM is a full-stack suite of native cloud-based applications for recruiting and talent workforce management. The SaaS offering is designed to provide support in one platform for employees and organizations during an employee's entire career, from hiring to career development to retiring. It can be accessed on and used across multiple devices, and was released as a module of Oracle Fusion applications in October 2011. Oracle developed Fusion infrastructure to support its cloud HCM (Human Capital Management) application, as well as its CRM (Customer Relationship Management); Financials; Governance, Risk, and Compliance; Procurement; Project Portfolio Management; and SCM (Supply Chain Management) cloud applications.

In December 2004, Oracle acquired PeopleSoft. Oracle integrated intellectual property and knowledge of HR from PeopleSoft into HCM Cloud.

In February 2012, Oracle acquired Taleo Corporation, integrating Taleo's Talent Management Cloud into Oracle's human resources management system (HRMS) application product.

In February 2014, Oracle released HCM Cloud 8, which made changes to social sourcing, time and attendance, workforce modeling, performance management, and succession planning components.

By 2015, Oracle's core HRMS and payroll ran completely on the cloud, and the company was building new Cloud HCM apps on mobile first to support an integrated mobile experience. These included life/work apps for employee wellness management, reputation management, and competitions.

In January 2018, Office Depot started using Oracle HCM as its HR/talent management platform. In October of that year, Oracle added third-party tie-ins for LinkedIn Talent Solutions and My Brand tools to HCM Cloud.

In 2019, HCM Cloud was chosen by the U.S. Department of Defense as part of its HR system.

In 2021, Oracle upgraded the platform to use low-code/no-code tools. It also introduced its Dynamic Skills platform capability which uses AI to catalog skills and suggest ways that employees and businesses as a whole can leverage skills.

== Talent and workforce management ==
Companies can use Cloud HCM workforce modeling and prediction tools to predict possible hiring and reorganization needs. There are: a benefits portal that allows employees to sign up for their own benefits, a talent management tool that supports talent acquisition (recruiting) and retention, and learning modules that allow individuals to create and share different classes. Cloud HCM also offers LinkedIn Talent Solutions tie-ins and My Brand tools to support employee collaboration and help employees find career development opportunities.

In 2021, Oracle released a tool called Oracle Dynamic Skills to help companies manage employee skills and identify skill gaps. The set of tools is made up of three major components: Skills Nexus, which uses AI to define and store skills profiles; Skills Advisor, a recommendation engine for skills across the talent business process that uses data about the employee and/or candidate; and Skills Center, a portal for employees to identify their skills and explore career growth opportunities.

== Human resources (HR) ==
The Oracle Human Resources module within Oracle HCM includes some of the following capabilities:

- Workforce modeling and prediction tools powered by data intelligence
- Contextual compensation metrics
- Employee benefits portal
- Low code/no-code tools for HR templates creation
- HR help desk
- Comprehensive onboarding process
- Work life portal to increase employee engagement and wellness
- Integrated employee directory to encourage collaboration
- AI-powered digital assistant

HR administrators can restrict users' access to information based on their location; use configurable, rule-based action lists to manage policies for represented workers; and use LinkedIn Recruiter integrations to automate sourcing, candidate search, and referral recommendations. Cloud HCM also provides a smart employee sourcing tool that calculates factors such as likelihood to accept, performance predictions, and expected tenure.

The HCM application is built to connect to a company's revenue and financial databases, working from the belief that employees are financially important and that financial and HR leadership may need to work together on long-term plans. With HCM, executives have access to total compensation metrics, can control compensation, and can design compensation plans.

In 2020, updates to the platform included Anytime Pay, which allows employees to request early pay, in addition to other payroll capabilities, and Opportunity Marketplace to help companies fill short-term needs.

== See also ==
- Human Resource Management
- Oracle Cloud
- Oracle Corporation
