= CLI =

CLI or cli may refer to:

== Computing ==
- Command-line interface, a means of interacting with software via commands – each formatted as a line of text
- Command-line interpreter, a software that reads command-line interface commands; see List of command-line interpreters
- Call Level Interface, an SQL database management API
- Common Language Infrastructure, for multi-platform code (.NET)
- CLI (x86 instruction), or Clear Interrupt

== Organizations ==
- Caribbean Law Institute, Florida, United States
- Charlotte Lozier Institute, the research arm of anti-abortion group Susan B. Anthony Pro-Life America
- Clì Gàidhlig, an organisation supporting learners of Scottish Gaelic
- Committee for the Liberation of Iraq, an American non-governmental organization
- Corps Léger d'Intervention, the special forces in the Far East French Expeditionary Corps
- Clintonville Municipal Airport (IATA airport code: CLI)

== Other uses ==
- 151 (number), in Roman numerals
- Canada Land Inventory, a multi-disciplinary land inventory of rural Canada
- Critical limb ischemia, a severe form of peripheral artery disease
- Caller Line Identification (Caller ID)
- Chakali (ISO 639-3 language code: cli)
- Cebu Landmasters (Philippine stock exchange code: CLI)

== See also ==
- Clicli, a character in Marine Boy
