= Oracle Fusion Middleware =

Software products

Oracle Fusion Middleware (FMW, also known as Fusion Middleware) consists of several software products from Oracle Corporation. FMW spans multiple services, including Java EE and developer tools, integration services, business intelligence, collaboration, and content management. FMW depends on open standards such as BPEL, SOAP, XML and JMS.

Oracle Fusion Middleware provides software for the development, deployment, and management of service-oriented architecture (SOA). It includes what Oracle calls "hot-pluggable" architecture, designed to facilitate integration with existing applications and systems from other software vendors such as IBM, Microsoft, and SAP AG.

== Evolution ==
Many of the products included under the FMW banner do not themselves qualify as middleware products: "Fusion Middleware" essentially represents a re-branding of many of Oracle products outside of Oracle's core database and applications-software offerings—compare Oracle Fusion.

Oracle acquired many of its FMW products via acquisitions. This includes products from BEA Systems and Stellent.

In order to provide standards-based software to assist with business process automation, HP has incorporated FMW into its "service-oriented architecture (SOA) portfolio".

Oracle leveraged its Configurable Network Computing (CNC) technology acquired from its PeopleSoft/JD Edwards 2005 purchase.

Oracle Fusion Applications, based on Oracle Fusion Middleware, were finally released in September 2010.

According to Oracle, as of 2013, over 120,000 customers were using Fusion Middleware. This includes over 35 of the world's 50 largest companies and more than 750 of the BusinessWeek Global 1000, with FMW also supported by 7,500 partners.

== Assessments ==
In January 2008, Oracle WebCenter Content (formerly Universal Content Management) won InfoWorld's "Technology of the Year" award for "Best Enterprise Content Manager", with Oracle SOA Suite winning the award for "Best Enterprise Service Bus".

In 2007, Gartner wrote that "Oracle Fusion Middleware has reached a degree of completeness that puts it on par with, and in some cases ahead of, competing software stacks", and reported revenue from the suite of over US$1 billion during FY06, estimating the revenue from the genuinely middleware aspects at US$740 million.

== Oracle Fusion Middleware components ==
- Infrastructure / Application server
  - Oracle WebLogic Server (WLS)
  - Oracle Application Server (IAS)
  - JRockit – a JVM whose functionality has now been merged to OpenJDK
  - Tuxedo (software)
  - Oracle Coherence
  - Oracle Service Registry – metadata registry
  - application-server security
  - Oracle Web Cache
  - Oracle HTTP Server - a web server based on Apache version 2.2.13.
- Integration and process-management
  - BPEL Process Manager
  - Oracle Business Activity Monitoring (Oracle BAM) – Business activity monitoring (BAM)
  - business rules
  - Business Process Analysis Suite
  - Oracle BPM – Business process management
  - Oracle Data Integrator (ODI) – an application using the database for set-based data integration
  - Enterprise connectivity (adapters)
  - Oracle Enterprise Messaging Service
  - Oracle Enterprise Service Bus
  - Oracle Application server B2B
  - Oracle Web Services Manager (OWSM) - a security and monitoring product for web services
- Application development tools
  - Oracle Application Development Framework (ADF)
  - JDeveloper
  - Oracle SOA Suite
  - TopLink – a Java object-relational mapping package
  - Oracle Forms services
  - Oracle Developer Suite
- Business intelligence
  - Oracle Business Intelligence (OBIEE)
  - Oracle Crystal Ball – enables stochastic forecasting and simulation using spreadsheet models
  - Oracle Discoverer
  - Data hubs
  - Oracle BI Publisher
  - Oracle Reports services
- Systems management
  - Oracle Enterprise Manager
  - Web services manager
- User interaction / content management
  - Oracle Beehive – collaboration platform
  - Unified messaging
  - Workspaces
  - Oracle WebCenter
  - Oracle Imaging and Process Management
  - Web content management
  - Records management
  - Enterprise search
  - Digital asset management
  - Email archiving
- Identity management
  - Oracle Identity Management
  - Enterprise Single sign-on
  - Oracle Entitlements Server
  - Oracle Identity Manager
  - Oracle Access Manager
  - Oracle Adaptive Access Manager
  - Oracle Virtual Directory

== See also ==
- BEA Systems
- Oracle Fusion Applications
- Oracle Technology Network (OTN)
- Stellent
