= Oracle Fusion Applications =

Enterprise application suite

Oracle Fusion Applications (OFA) are a suite of applications built on Oracle Cloud that include cloud-based applications for enterprise resource planning (ERP), enterprise performance management (EPM), supply chain management and manufacturing (SCM), human capital management (HCM), and customer experience (CX).

Oracle Fusion Applications were launched in September 2010 and released one year later at OpenWorld 2011. The name refers to the fact that each application runs in the cloud and shares one underlying platform, which means that data can be shared between them. This is different from many cloud applications that exist in isolation and are not interoperable. Oracle also developed "coexistence" processes that extend across all Oracle Applications so that users could adopt what they needed from Fusion while still using existing on-premise applications.

Oracle Fusion Applications were originally envisioned and pitched as an enterprise resource planning suite—a combination of features and functionalities taken from the Oracle E-Business Suite, JD Edwards, PeopleSoft, and Siebel product lines. The suite was built on top of the Oracle Fusion Middleware technology stack; both layers implement the Oracle Fusion Architecture, which leverages the capabilities of service-oriented architecture. Companies can deploy Fusion cloud applications in a private cloud, public cloud, hybrid cloud, or a private cloud built and managed by Oracle Cloud Services.

In September 2021, Oracle launched Fusion Marketing as part of Oracle Advertising and CX. The system uses artificial intelligence to automate digital marketing campaigns and identify qualified leads.

== See also ==
- Oracle Applications
- Oracle Advertising and Customer Experience (CX)
- Oracle Cloud ERP
- Oracle Fusion Architecture
- Oracle Fusion Middleware
- Oracle Cloud HCM
- Oracle SOA Suite
