= Oracle Adaptive Access Manager =

Oracle software

- Name: Oracle Adaptive Access Manager
- Formerly called: Bharosa
- Founders: Thomas Varghese; Don Bosco Durai; Jon Fisher, Bharosa CEO
- Company: Oracle Corporation
- Software: Oracle Identity Management
- Website: www.oracle.com/technetwork/middleware/id-mgmt/index-096126.html

The Oracle Adaptive Access Manager (OAAM) is part of the Oracle Identity Management product suite that provides access control services to web and other online applications. Oracle Adaptive Access Manager was developed by the company Bharosa, which was founded by Thomas Varghese, Don Bosco Durai and CEO Jon Fisher. The software was included in Oracle's acquisition of Bharosa.

== History ==
Oracle acquired Bharosa, which means 'trust' in the Hindi language, to extend its web-based access management solutions. In 2003, Bharosa was founded by Thomas Varghese, a research scientist and serial entrepreneur. Later, Don Bosco Durai and Jon Fisher came on board as co-founders.

== Design philosophy ==
The premise was simple in that the existing authentication technologies were unsatisfactory and easy to compromise. No authentication technology can really provide its full and intended security benefits unless the computer and computer network are re-designed from the grounds up.

Oracle Adaptive Access Manager has two components, the strong Authentication-agnostic security component and the application-agnostic Risk component. One simple example of the Strong Authentication component is that a User can choose a personalized keypad and use mouse clicks to enter password to prevent passwords being stolen with key loggers and being phished or pharmed. The Risk Component analyzes the authentication and transaction data for abnormalities and anomalies in real-time to prevent fraud and also in off-line mode to identify and detect internet fraud.
