= C. Edward McVaney =

American businessman (1940–2020)

- Born: C. Edward McVaney; December 29, 1940; Omaha, Nebraska, USA
- Died: June 4, 2020 (aged 79); Denver, Colorado, USA
- Occupations: philanthropist, investor and Chairman of the board

C. Edward McVaney (December 29, 1940 – June 4, 2020) was an American entrepreneur and technology executive. In 1977, he was a co-founder and became the CEO of JD Edwards Corporation, an enterprise resource planning company. McVaney served in the Coalition Provisional Authority, in Baghdad, Iraq, with the U.S. Department of Defense starting in November 2003 in the Ministry of Transportation and later the Ministry of the Interior.

In June 2003, JD Edwards arranged to be purchased by PeopleSoft for $1.8 billion. Oracle, within days, launched a hostile takeover bid for PeopleSoft with intent to exclude JD Edwards. PeopleSoft went ahead with the purchase of JD Edwards anyway, and in 2005, Oracle finally acquired the combined JD Edwards-PeopleSoft organization, bringing the JD Edwards WorldSoftware and EnterpriseOne product lines into the product portfolio of Oracle Corporation.

In 2016, McVaney became founder and chairman of the board at Nextworld.

== Early life ==
McVaney was born in Omaha, Nebraska, December 29, 1940. As his father was off to war as a World War II dentist, according to a 2002 interview, McVaney had very little memory of him until he came home at the end of the War. His father had graduated from Creighton University and while he served largely behind lines in the Army Air Corps, he came home from Europe with indications of post-traumatic stress syndrome and was haunted by nightmares and terrified by loud noises for many years after his return. McVaney recalls the day his father showed up saying that of him that he appeared to be "the biggest, tallest man in the whole world. I was just a little squirt". McVaney's siblings included three brothers, John, Richard, and Tim. His mother Mary McVaney, was a housewife and as a child, the family lived, as he describes it, "in a very frugal, frugal way" in their home on 38th Street in Omaha, Nebraska.

== Education ==
McVaney attended a Jesuit elementary prep school, and graduated from Creighton Preparatory School in 1959. He then went to Iowa State Teacher's College (now the University of Northern Iowa) on a football scholarship. He was on the dean's list and graduated with honors in 1964 with a BS in mechanical engineering. Discovered making "free calls" with little wire device to his girlfriend, Carole, in Lincoln, Nebraska, McVaney lost his football scholarship and left Iowa State Teacher's College. He returned to Creighton Prep School for a semester-and-a-half, and then attended the University of Nebraska. McVaney married Carole in 1963.

For post-graduate training, McVaney attended Rutgers University. McVaney and his wife lived in Cedar Grove, New Jersey.

== Career ==
Upon his graduation from Rutgers, McVaney was hired by Western Electric as an operations research engineer.

McVaney was transferred by Peat Marwick from New York City to Denver, Colorado in 1968. He continued with Marwick until 1970 when he took a position with Alexander Grant, now Grant Thornton LLP.

Along with co-workers, Dan Gregory and Jack Thompson, McVaney founded JD Edwards in 1977.

In 2016, McVaney founded Nextworld, an enterprise resource planning platform, in Denver, Colorado.

== Family life ==
McVaney was married for 57 years to his wife Carole, having met in high school and married in 1963. They had three children, as well as nine grandchildren.

== Philanthropy ==
In May 1998, McVaney donated more than $32 million to the University of Nebraska–Lincoln to establish the JD Edwards Honors Program (now the Jeffrey S. Raikes School). This program is charged with educating the next generation of business professionals by combining computer science education with business management skills.
