= Multicloud =

Type of IT infrastructure

Multicloud (also written as multi-cloud or multi cloud) is a term with varying interpretations, generally referring to a system using multiple cloud computing providers. According to ISO/IEC 22123-1: "multi-cloud is a cloud deployment model in which a customer uses public cloud services provided by two or more cloud service providers". Multi-cloud can involve various deployment models, including public, private, and hybrid clouds, and multiple service models, such as Infrastructure as a Service (IaaS), Platform as a Service (PaaS), and Software as a Service (SaaS). Multicloud incorporates workload, data, traffic, and workflow portability options, which can result in varying implementation complexity.

When effectively implemented, multicloud solutions can enhance architectural resilience, reduce dependence on a single vendor, and improve flexibility by leveraging services from different providers. However, multicloud strategies also present challenges, including increased operational complexity, security risks, higher costs, and integration difficulties.

According to the 2024 State of the Cloud Report by Flexera, multi-cloud adoption has continued to rise in 2024. Enterprises increasingly silo applications into specific clouds and select best-fit services. Key use cases include data analysis in separate clouds and cross-cloud disaster recovery.

== Advantages and challenges ==
There are several advantages to using a multicloud approach, including the ability to negotiate better pricing with cloud providers, the ability to quickly switch to another provider if needed, and the ability to avoid vendor lock-in. Multicloud can also be a good way to hedge against the risks of obsolescence, as it allows you to rely on multiple vendors and open standards, which can prolong the life of your systems.

Additional benefits of the multicloud architecture include adherence to local policies that require certain data to be physically present within the area/country, geographical distribution of processing requests from physically closer cloud unit which in turn reduces latency and protect against disasters.

Various issues and challenges also present themselves in a multicloud environment. Security and governance is more complicated, and more "moving parts" may create resiliency issues.

== Difference between multicloud and hybrid cloud ==
Multicloud differs from hybrid cloud in that it refers to multiple cloud services from different vendors rather than multiple deployment modes (on-premises hardware, and public and private, cloud hosting). However, when considering a broad definition of multi-cloud, hybrid cloud can still be regarded as a special form of multi-cloud.

== See also ==
- Cloud computing
- Serverless computing
