= JD Edwards =

Former American software company

- Logo used from 1977 to 2003
- Founded: 1977
- Fate: Acquired
- Successor: Oracle Corporation
- Headquarters: One Technology Way, Denver, Colorado, United States
- Key people: Ed McVaney, Dan Gregory and Jack Thompson
- Products: World, OneWorld, EnterpriseOne

J.D. Edwards World Solution Company or JD Edwards, abbreviated JDE, was an enterprise resource planning (ERP) software company, whose namesake ERP system is still sold under ownership by Oracle Corporation. JDE's products included World for IBM AS/400 minicomputers (the users using a computer terminal or terminal emulator), OneWorld for their proprietary Configurable Network Computing architecture (a client–server fat client), and JD Edwards EnterpriseOne (a web-based thin client). The company was founded March 1977 in Denver, by Jack Thompson, C.T.P. "Chuck" Hintze, Dan Gregory, and C. Edward "Ed" McVaney.

In June 2003, JD Edwards agreed to sell itself to PeopleSoft for $1.8 billion (equivalent to $3.15 billion in 2025). Within days, Oracle launched a hostile takeover bid for PeopleSoft sans JD Edwards. PeopleSoft went ahead with the JD Edwards acquisition anyway, and in 2005, Oracle Corporation finally took ownership of the combined JD Edwards-PeopleSoft organization. As of 2020, Oracle continues to sell and actively support both ERP packages, branded now as JD Edwards EnterpriseOne and JD Edwards World.

== History ==
=== Formation ===
Ed McVaney originally trained as an engineer at the University of Nebraska, and in 1964 was employed by Western Electric, then by Peat Marwick, and moved to Denver, in 1968, and later became a partner at Alexander Grant where he hired Jack Thompson and Dan Gregory. Around that time he was realizing that, in his words, "The culture of a public accounting firm is the antithesis of developing software. The idea of spending time on something that you’re not getting paid for—software development—they just could not stomach that." McVaney felt that accounting clients did not understand what was required for software development, and decided to start his own firm.

"JD Edwards" was founded in 1977 by Jack Thompson, Dan Gregory, and Ed McVaney; the company's name is drawn from the initials "J" for Jack, "D" for Dan, and "Edwards" for Ed. McVaney took a salary cut from $44,000 to $36,000 to ensure initial funding. Start-up clients included McCoy Sales, a wholesale distribution company in Denver, and Cincinnati Milacron, a maker of machine tools. The business received a $75,000 contract to develop wholesale distribution system software and a $50,000 contract with the Colorado Highway Department to develop governmental and construction cost accounting systems. The first international client was Shell Oil Company. Shell Oil implemented JD Edwards in Canada and then in Cameroon. Gregory flew to Shell Oil in Douala, Cameroon to install the company's first international, multi-national, multi-currency client software system.

=== Enterprise resource planning concept developed ===
As the majority of JD Edwards's customers were medium-sized companies, clients did not have large-scale software implementations. There was a basic business need for all accounting to be tightly integrated. As McVaney would explain in 2002, integrated systems were created precisely because "you can’t go into a moderate-sized company and just put in a payroll. You have to put in a payroll and job cost, general ledger, inventory, fixed assets and the whole thing. SAP had the same advantage that JD Edwards had because we worked on smaller companies, we were forced to see the whole broad picture." This requirement was relevant to both JDE clients in the US and Europe and their European competitor SAP, whose typical clients were much smaller than the American Fortune 500 firms. McVaney and his company developed what would be called enterprise resource planning (ERP) software in response to that business requirement.

=== World ERP System launched ===
The software ultimately sold was named JD Edwards WorldSoftware, popularly called World. Development began using System/34 and /36 minicomputers, changing course in the mid-1980s to the System/38, later switching to the AS/400 platform when it became available.

The company's initial focus was on developing the accounting software needed for their clients. World was server-centric as well as multi-user; the users would access the system using one of several IBM computer terminals or "green-screens". (Later on, users would run terminal emulator software on their personal computers).

As an ERP system, World comprised the three basic areas of expertise: functional/business analyst, programmer/software developer, and CNC/system administration.

=== OneWorld ERP system launched ===
By late 1996, JD Edwards delivered to its customers the result of a major corporate initiative: the software was now ported to platform-independent client–server systems. It was branded JD Edwards OneWorld, an entirely new product with a graphical user interface and a distributed computing model replacing the old server-centric model. The architecture JD Edwards had developed for this newer technology, called Configurable Network Computing or CNC, transparently shielded business applications from the servers that ran those same applications, the databases in which the data were stored, and the underlying operating system and hardware. By first quarter 1998, JD Edwards had 26 OneWorld customers and was moving its medium-sized customers to the new client–server flavor of ERP. By second quarter 1998, JDE had 48 customers, and by 2001, the company had more than 600 customers using OneWorld, a fourfold increase over 2000.

The company became publicly listed on September 24, 1997, with vice-president Doug Massingill being promoted to chief executive officer, at an initial price of $23 per share, trading on NASDAQ under the symbol JDEC. By 1998, JD Edwards' revenue was more than $934 million and McVaney decided to retire.

=== Quality control issues with OneWorld ===
Within a year of the release of OneWorld, customers and industry analysts were discussing serious reliability, unpredictability and other bug-related issues. In user group meetings, these issues were raised with JDE management. So serious were these major quality issues with OneWorld that customers began to raise the possibility of class-action lawsuits, leading to McVaney's return from retirement as CEO. At an internal meeting in 2000, McVaney said he had decided to "wait however long it took to have OneWorld 100% reliable" and had thus delayed the release of a new version of OneWorld because he "wasn't going to let it go out on the street until it was ready for prime time." McVaney also encouraged customer feedback by supporting an independent JD Edwards user group called Quest International. After delaying the upgrade for one year and refusing all requests by marketing for what he felt was a premature release, in the fall of 2000 JD Edwards released version B7333, now rebranded as OneWorld Xe.

Despite press skepticism, Xe proved to be the most stable release to date and went a long way toward restoring customer confidence. McVaney retired again in January 2002, although remaining a director, and Robert Dutkowsky from Teradyne was appointed as the new president and CEO.

=== Web-based client, continued product evolution ===
After the release of Xe, the product began to go through more broad change and several new versions. A new web-based client, in which the user accesses the JD Edwards software through their web browser, was introduced in 2001. This web-based client was robust enough for customer use and was given application version number 8.10 in 2005. Initial issues with release 8.11 in 2005 lead to a quick service pack to version 8.11 SP1, salvaging the reputation of that product. By 2006, version 8.12 was announced. Throughout the application releases, new releases of system/foundation code called Tools Releases were announced, moving from Tools Release versions 8.94 to 8.95. Tools Release 8.96, along with the application's upgrade to version 8.12, saw the replacement of the older, often unstable proprietary object specifications (also called "specs") with a new XML-based system, proving to be much more reliable. Tools Release 8.97 shipped a new web service layer allowing the JD Edwards software to communicate with third-party systems.

=== Acquisition by PeopleSoft and Oracle ===
Logo of JD Edwards used briefly in 2003

In June 2003, the JD Edwards board agreed to an offer in which PeopleSoft, a former competitor of JD Edwards, would acquire JD Edwards. The takeover was completed in July. OneWorld was added to PeopleSoft's software line, along with PeopleSoft's flagship product Enterprise, and was renamed JD Edwards EnterpriseOne.

Within days of the PeopleSoft announcement, Oracle Corporation mounted a hostile takeover bid of PeopleSoft. Although the first attempts to purchase the company were rebuffed by the PeopleSoft board of directors, by December 2004 the board decided to accept Oracle's offer. The final purchase went through in January 2005; Oracle now owned both PeopleSoft and JD Edwards. Most JD Edwards customers, employees, and industry analysts predicted Oracle would kill the JD Edwards products. However, Oracle saw a position for JDE in the medium-sized company space that was not filled with either its e-Business Suite or its newly acquired PeopleSoft Enterprise product.

=== EnterpriseOne and World software in Oracle portfolio ===
Oracle's JD Edwards products are known as JD Edwards EnterpriseOne and JD Edwards World. Oracle announced that JD Edwards support would continue until at least 2033.

Support for the older releases such as the Xe product were to expire by 2013, spurring the acceptance of upgrades to newer application releases. By 2015, the latest offering of EnterpriseOne was application version 9.2, released October 2015. The latest version of World (now with a web-based interface) was version A9.4, released in April 2015.

Shortly after Oracle acquired PeopleSoft and JD Edwards in 2005, Oracle announced the development of a new product called Oracle Fusion Applications. Fusion was designed to co-exist or replace JD Edwards EnterpriseOne and World, as well as Oracle E-Business Applications Suite and other products acquired by Oracle, and was finally released in September 2010. Despite the release of Fusion apps, JD Edwards EnterpriseOne and World is still sold and supported by Oracle and runs numerous businesses worldwide.

== See also ==
- Oracle Corporation – The parent corporation that acquired JD Edwards and PeopleSoft in 2004
- Oracle Fusion Applications – envisioned and pitched as an enterprise resource planning suite: a combination of features and functionalities taken from Oracle E-Business Suite, JD Edwards, PeopleSoft and Siebel product lines
- Configurable Network Computing – JD Edwards' CNC architecture allows heterogeneous systems combining mixed hardware, operating systems and back-end databases to work together seamlessly.
- C. Edward McVaney
