= Oracle Cloud =

Cloud computing service

- Developer: Oracle Corporation
- Release: October 20, 2016; 10 years ago
- Operating system: Linux, Microsoft Windows, iOS, Android
- Platform: Cross-platform
- Type: Web service, cloud computing, multicloud
- License: Closed source for platform, Open source for client SDKs
- Website: www.oracle.com/cloud/

Oracle Cloud is a cloud computing service offered by Oracle Corporation providing servers, storage, network, applications and services through a global network of Oracle Corporation managed data centers. The company allows these services to be provisioned on demand over the Internet.

Oracle Cloud provides infrastructure as a service (IaaS), platform as a service (PaaS), software as a service (SaaS), and data as a service (DaaS). These services are used to build, deploy, integrate, and extend applications in the cloud. This platform supports numerous open standards (SQL, HTML5, REST, etc.), open-source applications (Kubernetes, Spark, Hadoop, Kafka, MySQL, Terraform, etc.), and a variety of programming languages, databases, tools, and frameworks including Oracle-specific, open source, and third-party software and systems.

== Services ==
=== Infrastructure as a Service (IaaS) and Platform as a Service (PaaS) ===
Oracle's cloud infrastructure was made generally available (GA) on October 20, 2016 under the name "Oracle Bare Metal Cloud Services". Oracle Bare Metal Cloud Services was rebranded as Oracle Cloud Infrastructure in 2018 and dubbed Oracle's "Generation 2 Cloud" at Oracle OpenWorld 2018. Oracle Cloud Infrastructure offerings include the following services:

- Compute: The company provides Virtual Machine Instances to provide different shapes (VM sizes) catering to different types of workloads and performance characteristics. They also provide on-demand Bare metal servers and Bare metal GPU servers, without a hypervisor. In 2016, Oracle Cloud Infrastructure launched with bare metal instances with Intel processors. These first bare metal instances offered were powered by Intel servers. In 2018, Oracle Cloud added bare metal instances powered by AMD processors, followed by Ampere Cloud-native processors in 2021. In 2021, Oracle also released its first VM-based compute instances based on Arm processors.
- Storage: The platform provides block volumes, file storage, object storage, and archive storage for database, analytics, content, and other applications across common protocols and APIs.
- Networking: This cloud platform provides network with fully configurable IP addresses, subnets, routing, and firewalls to support new or existing private networks with end-to-end security.
- Governance: For auditing, identity and access management, the platform has data integrity checks, traceability, and access management features.
- Database Management / Data Management: Oracle offers a data management platform for database workloads as well as hyper-scale big data and streaming workloads including OLTP, data warehousing, Spark, machine learning, text search, image analytics, data catalog, and deep learning. The platform allows Oracle, MySQL, and NoSQL databases to be deployed on demand as managed cloud services. Oracle Databases uniquely offer the Oracle Autonomous Database (optimized for data warehouse, transaction processing, or JSON), the Exadata shape, as well as Real Application Clusters (RAC).
- Load Balancing: The cloud platform offers load balancing capability to automatically route traffic across fault domains and availability domains for high availability and fault-tolerance for hosted applications.
- Edge Services: These services can monitor the path between users and resources and adapt to changes and outages. They include Domain Name System (DNS) services from Oracle's acquisition of Dyn.
- FastConnect: The cloud platform provides private connectivity across on-premises and cloud networks through providers like Equinix, AT&T, and Colt.
- Application Development: For application development, the company's cloud offers an open, standards-based application development platform to build, deploy, and manage API-first, mobile-first cloud applications. This platform supports container-native, cloud-native, and low code development. This platform also provides a DevOps platform for CI/CD, diagnostics for Java applications, and integration with SaaS and on-prem applications. Services include Java, mobile, digital assistants (evolution from chatbots), messaging, application container cloud, developer cloud, visual builder, API catalog, AI platform, DataScience.com (Oracle acquired) and blockchain.
- Integration: This is a platform offering with adapters to integrate on-premise and cloud applications. Capabilities include data integration and replication, API management, integration analytics, along with data migration and integration. They offer services such as data integration platform cloud, data integrator cloud service, GoldenGate cloud service, integration cloud, process cloud service, API platform cloud service, apiary cloud service, and SOA cloud service.
- Business Analytics: The company provides this business analytics platform which can analyze and generate insights from data across various applications, data warehouses, and data lakes. The services offered include analytics cloud, business intelligence, big data discovery, big data preparation, data visualization, and essbase.
- Security: The Oracle Cloud Platform provides identity and security applications for providing secure access and monitoring of hybrid cloud environment and addressing IT governance and compliance requirements. This platform delivers an identity SOC (Security Operations Center) through a combined offering of SIEM, UEBA, CASB, and IDaaS. The services offered include Identity Cloud Service and CASB Cloud Service.
- Management: The platform provides an integrated monitoring, management, and analytics platform. This platform also uses machine learning and big data on the operational data set. The platform is used to improve IT stability, prevent application outages, improve DevOps, and harden security. Services offered include Application Performance Monitoring, Infrastructure Monitoring, Log Analytics, Orchestration, IT Analytics, Configuration and Compliance, Security Monitoring, and Analytics.
- Content and Experience: This is a platform for content, website, and workflow management. This service is used to provide content collaboration and web presence. This tool comes integrated with Oracle on-premise and SaaS services. The services offered are Content and Experience Cloud, WebCenter Portal Cloud, and DIVA Cloud.

In 2016, Oracle acquired Dyn, an internet infrastructure company. On May 16, 2018 Oracle announced that it had acquired DataScience.com, a privately held cloud workspace platform for data science projects and workloads. In April 2020, Oracle became the cloud infrastructure provider for Zoom, an online and video meeting platform. The same month, Nissan announced its migration to Oracle Cloud for its high-performance computing (HPC) workloads used for simulating the structural impacts of a car design. Xerox announced a partnership with Oracle Cloud in 2021, where Xerox will use Oracle's cloud-computing capabilities within its business incubator.

=== Software as a Service (SaaS) ===
Oracle provides SaaS applications also known as Oracle Cloud Applications. These applications are offered across a variety of products, industrial sectors with various deployment options to adhere to compliance standards. The below list mentions Oracle Cloud Applications provided by Oracle Corporation.

- Customer Experience (CX)
- Human Capital Management (HCM)
- Enterprise Resource Planning (ERP)
- Supply Chain Management (SCM)
- Enterprise Performance Management (EPM)
- Internet of Things Applications (IoT)
- SaaS Analytics
- Data
- Industry Solutions (Communications, Financial Services, Consumer Goods, High Tech and Manufacturing, Higher Education, Hospitality, Utilities)
- Deployment (adhering to standards for sectors such as Financial Services, Retail Services, Public Sector, Defense)
- Block-Chain Cloud Service (in partnership with SAP, IBM and Microsoft)
- Blockchain Applications

On July 28, 2016 Oracle bought NetSuite, the very first cloud company, for $9.3 billion.

=== Data as a Service (DaaS) ===
This platform is known as the Oracle Data Cloud. This platform aggregates and analyzes consumer data powered by Oracle ID Graph across channels and devices to create cross-channel consumer understanding.

== Deployment models ==
Oracle Cloud is available in 44 regions as of July 2023, including North America, South America, UK, European Union, Middle East, Africa, India, Australia, Korea, and Japan. Oracle Cloud is available as a public cloud (Oracle-managed regions); to selected government agencies as an Oracle-managed government cloud in the United States (with FedRAMP High and DISA SRG IL5 compliance) and United Kingdom; and as a "private cloud" or "hybrid cloud" as an Oracle-managed database-only service or full-service dedicated region - what Oracle calls "Cloud at Customer".

== Architecture ==
Oracle's public and government cloud is offered through a global network of Oracle-managed data centers, connected by an Oracle-managed backbone network. Oracle's Exadata Cloud at Customer leverages this network for control plane services. Oracle deploys their cloud in Regions, typically with two geographically distributed regions in each country for disaster resiliency with data sovereignty. Inside each Region are at least one fault-independent Availability Domain and three fault-tolerant Fault Domains per Availability Domain. Each Availability Domains contains an independent data center with power, thermal, and network isolation.

Oracle Cloud hosts customer-accessible cloud infrastructure and platform services, as well as end-user accessible software as a service from these cloud regions.

== See also ==
- Comparison of file hosting services
- Oracle Advertising and Customer Experience (CX)
- Oracle Enterprise Resource Planning Cloud
- Oracle HCM Cloud
