= PeopleSoft =

Defunct American corporation

PeopleSoft, Inc.
- Type: Subsidiary
- Founded: 1987; 39 years ago
- Successor: Oracle Corporation
- Headquarters: Pleasanton, California, United States
- Key people: David Duffield; Ken Morris
- Parent: Oracle Corporation
- Website: Official website

PeopleSoft, Inc. was an American company that provided human resource management systems (HRMS), financial management solutions (FMS), supply chain management (SCM), customer relationship management (CRM), and enterprise performance management (EPM) software, as well as software for manufacturing, and student administration to large corporations, governments, and organizations. It existed as an independent corporation until its acquisition by Oracle Corporation in 2005. The PeopleSoft name and product line are now marketed by Oracle.

== History ==
Founded in 1987 by Ken Morris and David Duffield, PeopleSoft was originally headquartered in Walnut Creek, California, before moving to Pleasanton, California. Duffield envisioned a client–server version of Integral Systems popular mainframe HRMS package. He cofounded PeopleSoft after leaving Integral Systems which was also based in Walnut Creek. It should not be confused with Integral Systems of Columbia, Maryland, a different company. The company's sole venture backing came from IBM. George J. Still Jr. from Norwest Venture Partners joined the board of directors.

PeopleSoft version 1, released in late 1989, was the first fully integrated, robust client–server HRMS application suite.

PeopleSoft expanded its product range to include a financials module in 1992, distribution in 1994, and manufacturing in 1996 after the acquisition of Red Pepper.

=== JD Edwards ===
In 2003, PeopleSoft accomplished a friendly merger with smaller rival JD Edwards. The latter's similar product line, World and OneWorld, targeted mid-sized companies too small to benefit from PeopleSoft's applications. JD Edwards' software used the Configurable Network Computing architecture, which shielded applications from both the operating system and the database back-end. PeopleSoft branded the OneWorld product PeopleSoft EnterpriseOne.

=== Oracle Corporation acquisition ===
Beginning in 2003, Oracle began to maneuver for control of the PeopleSoft company. In June 2003, Oracle made a $13 billion bid in a hostile takeover attempt. In February 2004, Oracle decreased their bid to approximately $9.4 billion; this offer was also rejected by PeopleSoft's board of directors. Complicating Oracle's takeover attempt was PeopleSoft's poison pill, allowing their customers to potentially receive refunds of 2–5 times the amount they had paid in the case of a takeover.

Later that month, the U.S. Department of Justice filed suit to block Oracle, on the grounds that the acquisition would break antitrust laws. In September 2004, the suit was rejected by a U.S. Federal judge, who found that the Justice Department had not proven its antitrust case. In October, the same decision was handed down by the European Commission. Although Oracle had reduced its offer to $7.7 billion in May, it again raised its bid in November to $9.4 billion.

In December 2004, Oracle announced that it had signed a definitive merger agreement to acquire PeopleSoft for approximately $10.3 billion. A month after the acquisition of PeopleSoft, Oracle cut over half of PeopleSoft's workforce, laying off 6,000 of PeopleSoft's 11,000 employees.

Oracle moved to capitalize on the perceived strong brand loyalty within the JD Edwards user community by rebranding former JD Edwards products. Thus PeopleSoft EnterpriseOne became JD Edwards EnterpriseOne and PeopleSoft World became JD Edwards World.

Oracle announced in 2005 that Fusion Applications would combine the best aspects of the PeopleSoft, JD Edwards, and Oracle Applications and merge them into a new product suite. The product was released in 2011.

=== Post-Oracle acquisition ===
Under Oracle, PeopleSoft offers different cloud-based software products, including Human Capital Management (HCM), Campus Solutions, Procurement and Supplier Management, Financial Management, and PeopleTools and Technology.

In 2010, PeopleSoft released its In-Memory Project Discovery. It translated unstructured data into structured data, which then allowed users to analyze keywords and data in the Services Automation suite. It ran on Oracle's Exalytics in-memory machine and Oracle Endeca Information Discovery enterprise data platform.

In 2015, Oracle PeopleSoft ERP (enterprise resource planning) was an on-premises system capable of running in Windows, Linux, UNIX, and IBM mainframe environments. In 2019, the Department of Foreign Affairs and Trade (DFAT) used the PeopleSoft Enterprise Human Resource platform for time and labor tracking, manager and employee self-service tools, and security.

== Product design ==
The original architecture for the PeopleSoft was a suite of products built on a client–server (two-tier) approach with a dedicated client. With the release of version 8, the entire suite was rewritten as an n-tier web-centric design called PeopleSoft Internet Architecture (PIA). The new format allowed all of a company's business functions to be accessed and run from within a web browser.

The PeopleSoft application suite functions as an ERP system, similar to SAP, or as single modules.

Implementation focused on PeopleSoft's proprietary PeopleTools technology. PeopleTools includes many different components used to create web-based applications.

== Security ==
In June 2026, Oracle issued a security alert for CVE-2026-35273, a critical PeopleSoft vulnerability that the extortion group ShinyHunters had exploited as a zero-day against more than 100 organizations, mostly universities. In September 2026, Mandiant reported renewed attacks that bypassed web application firewall rules some organizations had deployed instead of applying the patch. The FBI later attributed a September 2026 breach of its recruitment portal to a contractor's failure to apply a security patch, and Reuters, citing sources, identified the affected platform as PeopleSoft. In October 2026, the Zero Day Initiative, which had reported the flaw to Oracle in June, said that CVE-2026-35273 comprised three distinct vulnerabilities in PeopleSoft's Integration Gateway and Environment Management Hub, including a server-side request forgery, and that it was coordinating with Oracle to assign each a separate CVE identifier.

== See also ==
- ADP, Inc.
