= Comparison of OLAP servers =

The following tables compare general and technical information for a number of online analytical processing (OLAP) servers. Please see the individual products articles for further information.

== General information ==
| OLAP server | Company | Website | Latest stable version | Software license | License pricing |
|---|---|---|---|---|---|
| Apache Doris | Apache Software Foundation | | 1.2.3 | Apache 2.0 | free |
| Apache Druid | Apache Software Foundation | | 29.0.0 | Apache 2.0 | free |
| Apache Kylin | Apache Software Foundation | | 3.1.0 | Apache 2.0 | free |
| Apache Pinot | Apache Software Foundation | | 1.1.0 | Apache 2.0 | free |
| Atoti | ActiveViam | | 6.0.5 | Proprietary | community |
| ClickHouse | Clickhouse Inc | | 24.5 | Apache 2.0 | free |
| Essbase | Oracle | | 21.8 | Proprietary | |
| IBM Cognos TM1 | IBM | | 10.2.2 FP7 | Proprietary | - |
| icCube | icCube SARL | | 9.0.1 | Proprietary | community / |
| Jedox OLAP Server | Jedox | | 2019.3 | Proprietary | |
| Microsoft Analysis Services | Microsoft | | 2022 | Proprietary | |
| Mondrian OLAP server | Pentaho | | 3.7 | EPL | free |
| Oracle Database OLAP Option | Oracle | | 11g R2 | Proprietary | |
| SAP NetWeaver BW | SAP | | 7.30 | Proprietary | - |
| SAS OLAP Server | SAS Institute | | 9.4 | Proprietary | - |
| StarRocks | Linux Foundation | | 3.5 | Apache 2.0 | free |

== Data storage modes ==
| OLAP server | MOLAP | ROLAP | HOLAP | Offline |
|---|---|---|---|---|
| Apache Doris | Yes | Yes | Yes | Yes |
| Apache Druid | Yes | Yes | Yes | Yes |
| Apache Kylin | Yes | No | No | Yes |
| Apache Pinot | Yes | Yes | Yes | Yes |
| ClickHouse | Yes | Yes | Yes | Yes |
| Essbase | Yes | No | No | |
| IBM Cognos BI | Yes | Yes | Yes | |
| IBM Cognos TM1 | Yes | No | No | Cognos Insight Distributed mode |
| icCube | Yes | No | No | Yes |
| Jedox OLAP Server | Yes | No | No | No |
| Microsoft Analysis Services | Yes | Yes | Yes | Local cubes, PowerPivot for Excel, Power BI Desktop |
| MicroStrategy Intelligence Server | Yes | Yes | Yes | MicroStrategy Office, Dynamic Dashboards |
| Mondrian OLAP server | No | Yes | No | |
| Oracle Database OLAP Option | Yes | No | No | |
| SAP NetWeaver BW | Yes | Yes | No | |
| SAS OLAP Server | Yes | Yes | Yes | |
| StarRocks | Yes | Yes | Yes | Yes |

== APIs and query languages ==
APIs and query languages OLAP servers support.

| OLAP server | XML for Analysis | OLE DB for OLAP | MDX | Stored procedures | Custom functions | SQL | LINQ | Visualization | JSON | REST API |
|---|---|---|---|---|---|---|---|---|---|---|
| Apache Doris | No | No | No | No | Yes | Yes | No | Superset, Redash, Metabase, Tableau, Qlik, Pivot, PowerBI | Yes | Yes |
| Apache Druid | No | No | No | No | Yes | Druid SQL | No | Superset, Pivot, Redash | Yes | Yes |
| Apache Kylin | Yes | No | Yes | No | Yes | Yes | | Superset, Zeppelin, Tableau, Qlik, Redash, Microsoft Excel | Yes | Yes |
| Apache Pinot | No | No | No | No | Yes | Yes | No | Superset, Pivot, Redash | Yes | Yes |
| ClickHouse | No | No | No | No | Yes | Yes | No | Superset, Zeppelin, Tableau, Qlik, Redash, DataLens | Yes | Yes |
| Essbase | Yes | Yes | Yes | Yes | Yes | No | Yes | SmartView (Excel-AddIn), Oracle Analytics Cloud, Narrative Reporting, Tableau, IBM Cognos | ? | Yes |
| IBM Cognos TM1 | Yes | Yes | Yes | Yes | Yes | No | Yes | TM1 Web/TM1 Contributor, IBM Cognos Insight, IBM Performance Modeler, IBM Cognos Cafe for Excel, Cognos BI, TM1 Perspectives for Excel | Yes | Yes |
| icCube | Yes | Yes | Yes | Java, R | Yes | In the reporting | Yes | icCube reporting and all XMLA compliant visualization tools like Excel, etc | Yes | Yes |
| Jedox OLAP Server | Yes | Yes | Yes | Cube Rules, SVS Triggers | Yes | No | Yes | Microsoft Excel, Qlik, Tableau, Jedox Web, Power BI | No | Yes |
| Microsoft Analysis Services | Yes | Yes | Yes | .NET | Yes | Yes | Yes | Microsoft Excel, SharePoint, Microsoft Power BI, and 70+ other visualization tools | No | No |
| MicroStrategy Intelligence Server | Yes | No | Yes | Yes | Yes | Yes | Yes | Dossier, Dashboard, Reports | Yes | Yes |
| Mondrian OLAP server | Yes | Yes | Yes | Yes | Yes | No | Yes | Yes | ? | ? |
| Oracle Database OLAP Option | No | Yes | Yes | Java, PL/SQL, OLAP DML | Yes | Yes | No | ? | ? | ? |
| SAP NetWeaver BW | Yes | Yes | Yes | No | Yes | No | Yes | ? | ? | ? |
| SAS OLAP Server | Yes | Yes | Yes | No | No | No | Yes | Web Report Studio | ? | ? |
| StarRocks | No | No | No | No | Yes | Yes | No | Superset, Redash, Metabase, Tableau, Qlik, Pivot, PowerBI | Yes | Yes |

== OLAP distinctive features ==
A list of OLAP features that are not supported by all vendors. All vendors support features such as parent-child, multilevel hierarchy, drilldown.

Data processing, management and performance related features
| OLAP server | Real Time | Write-back | Partitioning | Usage Based Optimizations | Load Balancing and Clustering |
|---|---|---|---|---|---|
| Apache Doris | Yes | Yes | Yes | Yes | Yes |
| Apache Druid | Yes | ? | Yes | Yes | Yes |
| Apache Kylin | Yes | No | Yes | Yes | Yes |
| Apache Pinot | Yes | Yes | Yes | Yes | Yes |
| ClickHouse | Yes | Yes | Yes | Yes | Yes |
| Essbase | Yes | Yes | Yes | Yes | Yes |
| IBM Cognos BI | Yes | No | Yes | Yes | ? |
| IBM Cognos TM1 | Yes | Yes | Yes | ? | ? |
| icCube | Yes | No | Yes | ? | ? |
| Jedox OLAP Server | Yes | Yes | Yes | ? | ? |
| Microsoft Analysis Services | Yes | Yes | Yes | Yes | Yes |
| MicroStrategy Intelligence Server | ? | Yes | Yes | Yes | Yes |
| Mondrian OLAP server | Yes | Planned | Yes | ? | ? |
| Oracle Database OLAP Option | ? | Yes | Yes | No | ? |
| SAP NetWeaver BW | ? | Yes | Yes | ? | ? |
| SAS OLAP Server | ? | Yes | Yes | ? | ? |
| StarRocks | Yes | Yes | Yes | Yes | Yes |

Data modeling features
| OLAP server | Semi-additive measures | Many-to-Many | Multi-Cube Model | Perspectives | KPI | Multilingual | Named Sets | Multi-attribute Hierarchies | Actions |
|---|---|---|---|---|---|---|---|---|---|
| Apache Doris | Yes | Yes | Yes | Yes | Yes | Yes | Yes | Yes | No |
| Apache Druid | Yes | Yes | Yes | ? | No | Yes | ? | Yes | Yes |
| Apache Kylin | No | No | Yes | No | Yes | Yes | No | Yes | Yes |
| Apache Pinot | Yes | Yes | ? | ? | No | Yes | ? | Yes | Yes |
| ClickHouse | Yes | Yes | Yes | Yes | Yes | Yes | Yes | Yes | No |
| Essbase | Yes | ? | ? | ? | Yes | Yes | Yes | Yes | ? |
| IBM Cognos BI | Yes | Yes | ? | ? | ? | ? | Yes | Yes | ? |
| IBM Cognos TM1 | Yes | Yes | Yes | ? | ? | ? | ? | ? | ? |
| icCube | Yes | Yes | Yes | Yes | Yes | Yes | Yes | Yes | ? |
| Jedox OLAP Server | Yes | Yes | Yes | Yes | Yes | Yes | Yes | Yes | ? |
| Microsoft Analysis Services | Yes | Yes | Yes | Yes | Yes | Yes | Yes | Yes | Yes |
| MicroStrategy Intelligence Server | Yes | Yes | Yes | Yes | Yes | Yes | Yes | Yes | Yes |
| Mondrian OLAP server | Yes | ? | ? | ? | ? | ? | ? | ? | ? |
| Oracle Database OLAP Option | Yes | ? | ? | ? | ? | ? | ? | ? | ? |
| SAP NetWeaver BW | Yes | ? | ? | ? | ? | ? | ? | ? | ? |
| SAS OLAP Server | Yes | ? | ? | ? | ? | ? | ? | ? | ? |
| StarRocks | Yes | Yes | Yes | Yes | Yes | Yes | Yes | Yes | No |

== System limits ==
| OLAP server | # cubes | # measures | # dimensions | # dimensions in cube | # hierarchies in dimension | # levels in hierarchy | # dimension members |
|---|---|---|---|---|---|---|---|
| Apache Doris | Unrestricted | Unrestricted | Unrestricted | Unrestricted | Unrestricted | Unrestricted | Unrestricted |
| Apache Druid | Unrestricted (Note: Please update as 'unrestricted', is just not possible) | Unrestricted | Unrestricted | Unrestricted | Unrestricted | Unrestricted | Unrestricted |
| Apache Kylin | Unrestricted | Unrestricted | Unrestricted | Unrestricted | Unrestricted | Unrestricted | Unrestricted |
| Apache Pinot | Unrestricted | Unrestricted | Unrestricted | Unrestricted | Unrestricted | Unrestricted | Unrestricted |
| ClickHouse | Unrestricted | Unrestricted | Unrestricted | Unrestricted | Unrestricted | Unrestricted | Unrestricted |
| Essbase | Unrestricted | Unrestricted | Unrestricted | 255 | 255 | ? | 20,000,000 (ASO), 1,000,000 (BSO) |
| IBM Cognos TM1 | Unrestricted | Unrestricted | Unrestricted | 256 | Unrestricted | Unrestricted | Unrestricted |
| icCube | 2,147,483,647 | 2,147,483,647 | 2,147,483,647 | 2,147,483,647 | 2,147,483,647 | 2,147,483,647 | 2,147,483,647 |
| Jedox OLAP Server | $2^{32}$ (32 bits) | $2^{32}$ | $2^{32}$ (32 bits) | 250 | $2^{32}$ | $2^{32}$ | $2^{32}$ |
| Microsoft Analysis Services | 2,147,483,647 | 2,147,483,647 | 2,147,483,647 | 2,147,483,647 (max. number of dimensions in a database) | 2,147,483,647 | 2,147,483,647 | 2,147,483,647 (xOLAP) Unrestricted (In-memory) |
| MicroStrategy Intelligence Server | Unrestricted | Unrestricted | Unrestricted | ? | Unrestricted | Unrestricted | Unrestricted |
| SAS OLAP Server | Unrestricted | 1024 | 128 | ? | 128 | 19 | 4,294,967,296 |
| StarRocks | Unrestricted | Unrestricted | Unrestricted | Unrestricted | Unrestricted | Unrestricted | Unrestricted |

== Security ==
| OLAP server | Authentication | Network encryption | On-the-Fly (Note: On-the-Fly : The ability to define authentication dynamically via programmatic interfaces. New users do not require restarting the server or redefining the security.) | Data access | | |
| OLAP server | Authentication | Network encryption | On-the-Fly | Cell security | Dimension security | Visual totals |
|---|---|---|---|---|---|---|
| Apache Doris | Built-in, LDAP, Kerberos | SSL | Yes | Yes | Yes | Yes |
| Apache Druid | Druid Database authentication | SSL | Yes | No | Yes | No |
| Apache Kylin | LDAP, SAML, Kerboros, Microsoft Active Directory | SSL | Yes | No | No | ? |
| Apache Pinot | HTTP basic authentication | SSL | ? | No | No | No |
| ClickHouse | Built-in, LDAP, Microsoft Active Directory, Kerberos | SSL | Yes | Yes | Yes | Yes |
| Essbase | Essbase authentication, LDAP authentication, Microsoft Active Directory | SSL | Yes | Yes | Yes | No |
| IBM Cognos TM1 | Builtin, LDAP, Microsoft Active Directory, NTLM, IBM Cognos BI authentication | SSL | Yes | Yes | Yes | Yes |
| icCube | HTTP Basic/Form Authentication, Windows SSO (NTLM, Kerberos), Plugin Based for Embedded Usage | SSL | Yes | Yes | Yes | Yes |
| Jedox OLAP Server | Jedox authentication, LDAP, Microsoft Active Directory | SSL | Yes | Yes | Yes | ? |
| Microsoft Analysis Services | NTLM, Kerberos | SSL and SSPI | Yes | Yes | Yes | Yes |
| MicroStrategy Intelligence Server | Host authentication, database authentication, LDAP, Microsoft Active Directory, NTLM, SiteMinder, Tivoli, SAP, Kerberos | SSL, AES | ? | Yes | Yes | Yes |
| Oracle Database OLAP Option | Oracle Database authentication | SSL | ? | Yes | Yes | No |
| SAS OLAP Server | Host authentication, SAS token authentication, LDAP, Microsoft Active Directory | Yes | ? | Yes | Yes | Yes |

== Operating systems ==
The OLAP servers can run on the following operating systems:

| OLAP server | Windows | Linux | UNIX | z/OS | AIX |
|---|---|---|---|---|---|
| Apache Doris | No | Yes | Yes | No | No |
| Apache Druid | No | Yes | Yes | | |
| Apache Kylin | No | Yes | Yes | No | No |
| Apache Pinot | Yes | Yes | Yes | Yes | Yes |
| ClickHouse | No | Yes | Yes | No | No |
| Essbase | Yes | Yes | Yes | No | Yes |
| IBM Cognos TM1 | Yes | Yes | Yes | No | Yes |
| icCube | Yes | Yes | Yes | Yes | Yes |
| Jedox OLAP Server | Yes | Yes | Yes | No | |
| Microsoft Analysis Services | Yes | No | No | No | |
| MicroStrategy Intelligence Server | Yes | Yes | Yes | No | Yes |
| Mondrian OLAP server | Yes | Yes | Yes | Yes | |
| Oracle Database OLAP Option | Yes | Yes | Yes | Yes | |
| SAP NetWeaver BW | Yes | Yes | Yes | Yes | |
| SAS OLAP Server | Yes | Yes | Yes | Yes | |
| StarRocks | No | Yes | Yes | No | No |

Note (1):The server availability depends on Java Virtual Machine not on the operating system

== Support information ==
| OLAP server | Issue Tracking System | Roadmap | Source code |
|---|---|---|---|
| Apache Doris | Apache Doris– Github Issues | Apache Doris Roadmap | Open |
| Apache Druid | Druid – Github Issues | | Open |
| Apache Kylin | Jira | Apache Kylin Roadmap | Open |
| Apache Pinot | Apache Pinot – Github Issues | | Open |
| ClickHouse | ClickHouse – Github Issues | ClickHouse Roadmap | Open |
| Essbase | myOracle Support | | Closed |
| IBM Cognos TM1 | IBM Service Request | | Closed |
| icCube | Stackoverflow | | Closed |
| Jedox OLAP Server | Mantis | Available upon request | Open |
| Microsoft Analysis Services | Connect | - | Closed |
| MicroStrategy Intelligence Server | MicroStrategy Resource Center | - | Closed |
| Mondrian OLAP server | Jira | | Open |
| Oracle Database OLAP Option | myOracle Support | | Closed |
| SAP NetWeaver BW | OSS | | Closed |
| SAS OLAP Server | Support | | Closed |
| StarRocks | StarRocks– Github Issues | StarRocks Roadmap | Open |

== See also ==
- Cubes (light-weight open-source OLAP server)
- ClickHouse
- Apache Pinot
- Apache Druid
- Apache Doris
- Oracle Essbase
- Oracle Retail Predictive Application Server (RPAS), a retail specific MOLAP/OLAP server using Berkeley DB for persistence
- Palo (OLAP database)
- StarRocks
