= List of column-oriented DBMSes =

This article is a list of column-oriented database management system software.

== Free and open-source software (FOSS) ==
Database name	Language implemented in	Notes
Apache Doris	Java & C++	Open source (since 2017), database for high-concurrency point queries and high-throughput analysis.
Apache Druid	Java	Started in 2011 for low-latency massive ingestion and queries. Support and extensions available from Imply Data.
Apache Kudu	C++	Released in 2016 to complete the Apache Hadoop ecosystem
Apache Pinot	Java	Open sourced in 2015 for real-time low-latency analytics. Support and extensions available from StarTree.
Arc	Go	Columnar analytical database built on DuckDB, Parquet, and Apache Arrow. Supports Line Protocol, MessagePack, and SQL. Released under AGPL-3.0. Published in 2025 by Basekick Labs for product analytics, observability, IoT telemetry, and AI-agent memory workloads.
Calpont InfiniDB	C++	
ClickHouse	C++	Released in 2016 to analyze data that is updated in real time
CrateDB	Java	
C-Store	C++	The last release of the original code was in 2006; Vertica a commercial fork, lives on.
DuckDB	C++	An embeddable, in-process, column-oriented SQL OLAP RDBMS
Databend	Rust	An elastic and reliable Serverless Data Warehouse
InfluxDB	Rust	Time series database
Greenplum Database	C	Support and extensions available from VMware.
HEAVY.AI	C++	Formerly MapD
MariaDB ColumnStore	C & C++	Formerly Calpont InfiniDB
Metakit	C++	
MonetDB	C	Open-source (since 2004) columnar Relational DBMS pioneer
PostgreSQL cstore fdw, vops	C	cstore_fdw uses ORC format
StarRocks	Java & C++	Open source, unified analytics platform for batch and real-time analytics. Supports and extensions available from CelerData.
VictoriaMetrics	Go	Time series database
TiDB	Go, Rust & C++	TiDB provides columnar storage via the TiFlash component

== Platform as a Service (PaaS) ==
- Amazon Redshift
- Basekick Labs – Arc Cloud, managed hosting for the Arc columnar analytical database.
- Microsoft Azure Synapse Analytics (formerly Azure SQL Data Warehouse)
- Google BigQuery
- Oracle Autonomous Data Warehouse Cloud (ADWC)
- Snowflake Computing
- MariaDB SkySQL
- Actian Avalanche
- Vertica Accelerator
- CelerData

== Proprietary ==
- Actian Vector (formerly VectorWise)
- Actuate Corporation BIRT Analytics ColumnarDB
- Dimensional Insight
- Endeca
- EXASOL
- EXtremeDB
- Hydrolix
- IBM Db2
- Infobright
- KDB
- kdb+
- memSQL
- Microsoft SQL Server
- Oracle Database (in-memory option)
- SAND CDBMS
- SAP HANA
- SAP IQ
- SenSage
- SQream
- Teradata
- Vertica (developed from open source C-Store)
- Yellowbrick Data
