= JKool =

jKool
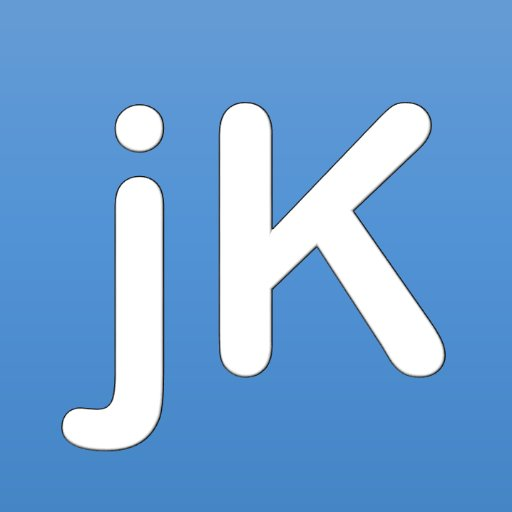
- Type: Private
- Industry: IT industry
- Founded: 2014
- Headquarters: Plainview, New York
- Website: jkoolcloud.com

jKool is a software company based in Plainview, NY, that produces software for visualizing and analyzing machine-generated data, including: logs, metrics and transactions in real-time, via a web-based interface. jKool analyzes big data including both data-in-motion (real-time) and data-at-rest (historical). jKool offers its software through several channels including IBM Bluemix and as an on-premises offering.

== Product ==
jKool was designed to be a highly scalable, SaaS solution leveraging open-source software that provides real-time streaming analytics for big data and was announced at All Things Open. The technology at jKool was built using open-source software including Apache Spark, Apache STORM, and Apache Kafka sitting on top of the NoSQL database, Apache Cassandra and the search engine Apache Solr, the last two from DataStax. The micro-services platform FatPipes is used as the orchestration layer to control data management, messaging and configuration.

jKool created a query language suitable for business users called jKQL.

A version of the jKool product has been integrated with the IBM Cloud Marketplace.
