= Hexis (disambiguation) =

Hexis is a term used in Aristotelian philosophy.

Hexis may also refer to:

- Hexis S.A., a French manufacturer of self-adhesive vinyl (PVC) films
- Hexis Racing, a French auto racing team
- Hexis, formerly part of the enterprise security company Sensage

== See also ==
- Hexisea, a flower of the family of orchids
