= FASMI =

Analysis in data management

Fast Analysis of Shared Multidimensional Information (FASMI) is an alternative term for OLAP. The term was coined by Nigel Pendse of The OLAP Report (now known as The BI Verdict), because he felt that the 12 rules that Tedd Codd used to define OLAP were too controversial and biased (the rules were sponsored by Arbor Software, the company which developed Essbase). Also, Pendse considered that the list of 12 rules was too long, and the OLAP concept could be defined in only five rules.
