= OWB =

OWB may refer to:

- Oracle Warehouse Builder
- Origyn Web Browser aka Odyssey Web Browser
- The IATA airport code for Owensboro-Daviess County Regional Airport in Owensboro, Kentucky, United States
- A handgun holster worn outside the waistband

Old World Blues, a DLC in Fallout: New Vegas

Old World Blues, a mod for the computer wargame Hearts of Iron IV

ÖWB may refer to:

- Österreichisches Wörterbuch (Austrian dictionary)
