= Palo (OLAP database) =

OLAP database

- Developer: Jedox AG
- Stable release: 2020.4 / November 26, 2020; 5 years ago
- Operating system: Linux, Windows
- Type: OLAP
- License: GPL v2, LGPL until v5.1 Proprietary from v5.1
- Website: jedox.com

Palo is a memory resident multidimensional (online analytical processing (OLAP) or multidimensional online analytical processing (MOLAP)) database server and typically used as a business intelligence tool for controlling and budgeting purposes with spreadsheet software acting as the user interface. Beyond the multidimensional data concept, Palo enables multiple users to share one centralised data storage (single version of the truth).

This type of database is suitable to handle complex data models for business management and statistics. Apart from multidimensional queries, data can also be written back and consolidated in real-time. To give rapid access to all data, Palo stores them in the memory during run time. The server is available as open-source and proprietary software.

Jedox was founded by Kristian Raue in 2002 and developed by Jedox AG, a company HQed in Freiburg, Germany. The firm currently employs approximately 300 people. Kristian Raue's departure from Jedox was announced in June 2014.

== Features ==
Palo for Excel is an open source plug-in for Microsoft Excel. There is also an open source plug-in for OpenOffice.org named PalOOCa (discontinued), with Java and web client also available from the JPalo project. Palo can also be integrated into other systems via its client libraries for Java, PHP, C/C++, or .NET Framework. It is fairly easy to communicate with Palo OLAP Server, since it uses representational state transfer (REST).

Starting in October 2008, Palo supports XML for Analysis and MultiDimensional eXpressions (MDX) APIs for connectivity, and OLE DB for OLAP interface which allows standard Excel pivot tables to serve as a client tool. Starting September 2011, Palo supports SDX dialect of LINQ.

Palo also provides a web-based spreadsheet interface called Palo Web.

== Architecture ==
Palo Suite is a tightly integrated framework consisting of: Palo MOLAP Server, Palo ETL Server, Palo Web (Palo Spreadsheet - Connection, User, ETL, File and Report Manager), Palo for Excel, Palo Supervision Server and the Palo Client Libraries.

The Data in Palo database is stored as a cube in the Palo MOLAP server. The Palo Excel Add-In component is used as a service to communicate between the Excel and the Palo MOLAP Server.

== Licensing ==
Jedox announced only commercial licensing is available since 5.1 version (2015).

== See also ==
- MOLAP
- Business intelligence
- Performance management
- Comparison of OLAP servers
