= BackType =

BackType, Inc.
- Company type: Private
- Founded: 2008
- Founders: Christopher Golda; Michael Montano
- Website: http://www.backtype.com
- Current status: Acquired by Twitter

BackType was a SaaS social media analytics service launched in August 2008.

Initially, BackType was focused only on blog comments, aggregating comments from across blogs and allowing users to search them by topic or author. It followed with BackType Connect, a service that allowed users to reverse lookup a URL to view comments written in response across the web. Notably, this also included tweets referring to the URL (even if it the URLs had been shortened). They also launched BackTweets, a web site dedicated to tracking conversations on the micro-blogging site, searchable by keyword or URL.

Before raising venture capital, BackType was nominated in the best bootstrapped startup category at the 2008 Crunchies.

== Technology ==
The distributed data processing work to build the BackType product became the basis for the Lambda architecture. At its peak scale, BackType was storing 25 terabytes of compressed binary data on its servers, holding over 100 billion individual records. Its API served 400 requests per second on average.

Apache Storm, a distributed stream processing computation framework written predominantly in the Clojure programming language was created at BackType, and later open sourced at Twitter. Storm was made a Top-Level Project by the Apache Foundation in 2014.

== Financing ==
BackType received $15,000 of seed funding from Y Combinator in 2008, and it received $300,000 of venture capital funding from True Ventures in 2009. In March 2011, BackType received just over $1mm in venture capital funding from a group of Silicon Valley investors, including lead investor True Ventures, as well as Chris Sacca's Lowercase Capital, Founder Collective, K9 Ventures, Freestyle Capital, 500 Startups, and more. It also added Stephen Cohen, one of the co-founders of Palantir Technologies, as an advisor.

== Acquisition ==
On July 5, 2011, BackType was acquired by Twitter for an undisclosed sum.
