= Oracle OLAP =

The Oracle Database OLAP Option implements On-line Analytical Processing (OLAP) within an Oracle database environment. Oracle Corporation markets the Oracle Database OLAP Option as an extra-cost option to supplement the "Enterprise Edition" of its database. (Oracle offers Essbase for customers without the Oracle Database or who require multiple data-sources to load their cubes.)

As of Oracle Database 11g, the Oracle database optimizer can transparently redirect SQL queries to levels within the OLAP Option cubes. The cubes are managed and can take the place of multi-dimensional materialized views, simplifying Oracle data-warehouse management and speeding up query response.

== Logical components ==
The Oracle Database OLAP Option offers:

- an OLAP analytic engine
- workspaces
- an analytic workspace manager (AWM)
- a worksheet environment
- OLAP DML for DDL and DML
- an interface from SQL
- an analytic workspace Java API
- a Java-based OLAP API

== Physical implementation ==
The Oracle database tablespace CWMLITE stores OLAPSYS schema objects and integrates Oracle Database OLAP Option with the Oracle Warehouse Builder (OWB). The CWMLITE name reflects the use of CWM — the Common Warehouse Metamodel, which Oracle Corporation refers to as "Common Warehouse Metadata".

== See also ==
- Business intelligence
- Comparison of OLAP servers
- Essbase
