= Oracle Retail Predictive Application Server =

The Oracle Retail Predictive Application Server (commonly referred to as RPAS) is a configurable software platform for developing forecasting and planning applications, following a Client/Server OLAP model. The RPAS platform provides capabilities such as a multidimensional database structure (it follows the MOLAP model but has some ROLAP capabilities), batch and online processing, a configurable slice-and-dice user interface, a sophisticated configurable calculation engine, user security and utility functions such as importing and exporting.

RPAS is the foundation for a significant number of applications that are part of the Oracle Retail solution footprint, such as Oracle Retail Demand Forecasting, Oracle Merchandise Financial Planning, Oracle Assortment Planning, Oracle Item Planning, Oracle Size Profile Optimization, Oracle Replenishment Optimization and Oracle Advanced Inventory Planning. The latest version is Version 16 released in December 2016, and supports deployment of planning applications on-premise or Software as a service over the internet.

RPAS currently offers 2 data persistence options: a proprietary datastore based on Oracle Berkeley DB, or an Oracle RDBMS (which supports real time updates from external systems but reduces the performance of the MOLAP cubes). Originally the persistence layer (and some of the processing) was based on a MOLAP engine called Acumate/Acumen, originally developed by Mars Inc. for in house reporting and analysis; the software was sold by Mars and went through several owners, ultimately being owned by Lucent via an acquisition of a previous owner. Acumate is now no longer generally available or in support from Lucent. (Limited sustaining support for Acumate is available from Oracle to support the few remaining older installations of RPAS that were Acumate based, based on a source code license that was held by the predecessor to Oracle Retail, Retek, with the source code license novated to Oracle for support purposes).
