= Apache Samza =

Open-source distributed stream processing

- Original author: LinkedIn
- Developer: Apache Software Foundation
- Stable release: 1.8.0 / 17 January 2023; 3 years ago
- Written in: Scala, Java
- Operating system: Cross-platform
- Type: Distributed stream processing
- License: Apache License 2.0
- Website: samza.apache.org
- Repository: Samza Repository

Apache Samza is an open-source, near-realtime, asynchronous computational framework for stream processing developed by the Apache Software Foundation in Scala and Java. It has been developed in conjunction with Apache Kafka. Both were originally developed by LinkedIn.

== Overview ==
Samza allows users to build stateful applications that process data in real-time from multiple sources including Apache Kafka.

Samza provides fault tolerance, isolation and stateful processing. Unlike batch systems such as Apache Hadoop or Apache Spark, it provides continuous computation and output, which result in sub-second response times.

There are many players in the field of real-time stream processing and Samza is one of the mature products. It was added to Apache in 2013.

Samza is used by multiple companies. The biggest installation is in LinkedIn.

== See also ==
- Apache Beam
- Druid (open-source data store)
- List of Apache Software Foundation projects
- Storm (event processor)
