= Mondrian OLAP server =

Online analytical processing software

Mondrian OLAP Server
- Developer(s): Pentaho Corporation
- Stable release: 3.14.0 / May 17, 2017
- Repository: github.com/pentaho/mondrian
- Platform: Java
- Type: OLAP Server
- License: EPL
- Website: mondrian.pentaho.com/documentation/index.php

Mondrian is an open source OLAP (online analytical processing) server, written in Java. It supports the MDX (multidimensional expressions) query language, as well as the XML for Analysis and olap4j interface specifications. It reads from SQL and other data sources and aggregates data in a memory cache.

Mondrian is a relational OLAP.

== History ==
The first public release of Mondrian was on August 9, 2002.

It was acquired by Pentaho in 2005, and was integrated in Pentaho's Business intelligence software, with several major updates in 2007.

== See also ==
- Comparison of OLAP servers
