= Apache Helix =

Open-source cluster management framework

- Original author: LinkedIn
- Developer: Contributors
Stable release
- 0.9.x: 0.9.9 / 11 May 2022; 4 years ago
- 1.x: 1.0.4 / 31 August 2020; 6 years ago
- Written in: Java
- Type: Cluster management framework
- License: Apache License 2.0
- Website: helix.apache.org
- Repository: Helix Repository

Apache Helix is an open-source cluster management framework developed by the Apache Software Foundation.

== History ==
Helix a stable cluster management framework used for the automatic management of partitioned, replicated and distributed resources hosted on a cluster of systems.

Other frameworks originally developed by Apache are Apache Samza, Apache Kafka and Voldemort. The origins of Helix lie in a distributed NoSQL called Espresso.
