= Apache Kylin =

Open-source distributed analytics engine

- Developer: Apache Kylin Committee
- Initial release: June 10, 2015; 10 years ago
Stable release
- 3.x: 3.1.3 / 5 January 2022; 4 years ago
- 4.x: 4.0.1 / 5 January 2022; 4 years ago
- Written in: Java
- License: Apache License 2.0
- Website: kylin.apache.org
- Repository: Kylin Repository

Apache Kylin is an open source distributed analytics engine designed to provide a SQL interface and multi-dimensional analysis (OLAP) on Hadoop and Alluxio supporting extremely large datasets.

It was originally developed by eBay, and is now a project of the Apache Software Foundation.

== History ==
The Kylin project was started in 2013, in eBay's R&D in Shanghai, China. In Oct 2014, Kylin v0.6 was open sourced on GitHub.com with the name "KylinOLAP".

In November 2014, Kylin joined Apache Software Foundation incubator.

In December 2015, Apache Kylin graduated to be a Top Level Project.

In March 2016, Kyligence, Inc. was founded by the creators of Apache Kylin. Kyligence provides a commercial analytics platform based on Apache Kylin for on-premise and cloud-based datasets.

== Architecture ==
Apache Kylin is built on top of Apache Hadoop, Apache Hive, Apache HBase, Apache Parquet, Apache Calcite, Apache Spark and other technologies. These technologies enable Kylin to easily scale to support massive data loads.

Kylin has the following core components:

- REST Server: Receive and response user or API requests
- Metadata: Persistent and manage system, especially the cube metadata;
- Query Engine: Parse SQL queries to execution plan, and then talk with storage engine;
- Storage Engine: Pushdown and scan underlying cube storage (default in HBase);
- Job Engine: Generate and execute MapReduce or Spark job to build source data into cube;

== Users ==
Apache Kylin has been adopted by many companies as their OLAP platform in production. Typical users includes eBay, Meituan, XiaoMi, NetEase, Beike, Yahoo! Japan.

== Roadmap ==
Apache Kylin roadmap (from Kylin website):

- Hadoop 3.0 support (Erasure Coding) - completed (v2.5)
- Fully on Spark Cube engine - completed (v2.5)
- Connect more data sources (MySQL, Oracle, SparkSQL, etc.) - completed (v2.6)
- Real-time analytics with Lambda Architecture - completed (v3.0)
- Cloud-native storage (Parquet) - In progress (v4.0.0-alpha)
- Ad hoc queries without Cubing
