= SAND CDBMS =

Database management software

SAND Nucleus CDBMS is a column-oriented DBMS software system optimized for business intelligence applications, delivering the data warehousing component, developed by SAND Technology Inc.

== Company history ==
SAND Technology was founded in 1983.

SAND CDBMS traces its roots to developments by Nucleus International Corporation research and eventual patent issued to, among others, Edward L. Glaser on “Bit string compressor with boolean operation processing capability.”

Originally encoded on firmware, the application is now completely software based.

SAND Technology is now a division of N. Harris Computer Corporation.

== Description ==
A fully tokenized, bit array encoded and compressed database, data storage is column-oriented using domains across schemas/tables rather than as rows of data within tables. This results in an optimized platform for data analytics and data mining, although not suitable for transaction processing.

This architecture exhibits the following characteristics:

- All columns act as if they are indexed
- Actual data values are stored only once and referenced by their token
- Columns use lossless data compression when stored
- Only columns requested in a query are accessed from the database
- Queries are done directly on the compressed columns and only the result set is decompressed.

Platform agnostic, SAND CDBMS runs on 64 bit Windows or the following 64 bit Linux/Unix environments: HP-UX, IBM-AIX, Red Hat Linux, SuSE Linux and Sun Solaris.

== Database Administration ==
SAND/DNA Analytics is managed via ANSI standard SQL and DML commands.

Database space allocation and core management are done by the database engine. This means typical database administration is focused on data modeling, data content, managing the data life cycle and managing the user profiles and access permissions.

Data loading is straight forward and only requires pointing to the source and destination in load scripts. There are multiple data manipulation functions and commands available, but all internal structure optimizations are automatically managed by the database engine.

While data load performance can be slower than row based databases, it is mitigated by not having to build any indexes or run post-load administration routines once complete. Parallel load processing or segmented pre-load processing can also be used to improve load performance.

A core feature of SAND CDBMS is its support of “virtual” mounting of a database. This provides an isolated environment for developing and testing changes to a database, where, upon dismounting, the entire environment is removed.
