= HEAVY.AI =

American software company

- Formerly: OmniSci, MapD
- Type: Private
- Industry: Software, Advanced Analytics
- Founded: September 2013
- Founder: Todd Mostak, Thomas Graham
- Fate: Acquired by Nvidia
- Headquarters: San Francisco, California
- Area served: Worldwide
- Products: SQL Engine and Visualization

HEAVY.AI was an American software company that uses graphics processing units (GPUs) and central processing units (CPUs) to query and visualize big data. The company was founded in 2013 by Todd Mostak and Thomas Graham and is headquartered in San Francisco, California. In 2025, the company was acquired by Nvidia.

The company had a range of products, which help process and visualize big data. HEAVY.AI partnered with a number of organizations, such as Nvidia, to help build an infrastructure system which processes data much faster than traditional CPU methods. By using multiple GPU cards at once, HEAVY.AI's technology processed process data at a much faster rate than CPU's.

HEAVY.AI raised funds in 2016 via a Series A, in 2017 via a Series B, and in 2018 via a Series C funding round.

== History ==
Todd Mostak and Thomas Graham founded HEAVY.AI, then named MapD, in 2013. Since their foundation, the company focused on providing its services to a variety of markets, including government, public and private companies.

HEAVY.AI's main offering was the Core database system, which was developed shortly after the company was founded. The system worked using GPU technology, which allows for rapid processing and mapping of big data. The idea came while Mostak was working with Ben Lewis at the Harvard Center for Geographic Analysis and his queries were taking hours or even days to complete using more traditional IT methods.

After setting up a GPU system and thorough testing, InformationWeek stated that the process was 75 times to 3,500 times faster than using a traditional CPU to process big data. Mostak wasn't alone in researching ways to process big data. After winning $100,000 at an Nvidia-ran competition, Nvidia's research in the space has led them to be able to process 750GB per second using a GPU system, when ran in conjunction with systems that OmniSci produce. Other corporations such as IBM were also quoted to be using OmniSci's technology to develop GPU systems.

Prior to the 2016 presidential election, HEAVY.AI created a visualization of political donations as a tool to attempt to predict certain outcomes in the election. In 2017, it was announced that HEAVY.AI would become one of the founding members of the GPU Open Analytics Initiative.

In September 2018, OmniSci was rebranded from MapD.

In March 1, 2022, OmniSci rebranded to Heavy.AI.

== Funding ==
In 2016, it was announced that HEAVY.AI had raised capital via a Series A funding round, believed to be $10 million. A number of major participants were listed in the round, which was led by In-Q-Tel. Other participants included Nvidia, Vanedge Capital, and Verizon Wireless. Nvidia became interested in HEAVY.AI, after the company won $100,000 from Nvidia at their GPU Ventures contest.

The following year, HEAVY.AI raised capital via a Series B funding round. The round secured $25 million in additional funding for OmniSci, with New Enterprise Associates, Nvidia and Verizon leading the funding round.

In October 2018, HEAVY.AI secured $55 million through a Series C funding round led by Tiger Global Management, and with the participation of existing investors, including In-Q-Tel, New Enterprise Associates, Vanedge Capital, Nvidia and Verizon Ventures.
