= Oracle Warehouse Builder =

Mapping editor in Oracle Warehouse Builder 11g

Oracle Warehouse Builder (OWB) is an ETL tool produced by Oracle that offers a graphical environment to build, manage and maintain data integration processes in business intelligence systems.

== Features ==
The primary use for OWB is consolidation of heterogeneous data sources in data warehousing and data migration from legacy systems. Further it offers capabilities for relational, dimensional and metadata data modeling, data profiling, data cleansing and data auditing. Whereas the core functionality is part of the Oracle database since version 10gR2, some of the latter features are sold separately as options. OWB uses a variant of Tcl over Java and PL/SQL called OMB+.

== History ==
Oracle Warehouse Builder was built from the ground up in Oracle, it was first released in January 2000 (release 2.0.4). The 3i release significantly enhanced the ETL mapping designer, then 9i in 2003 introduced the mapping debugger, process flow editing, integrated match/merging and name/address cleansing, multi-table insert, scripting, RAC certification to name a few. The 10gR1 release was essentially a certification of the 10g database, and the 10gR2 release (code named Paris) was a huge release incorporating a wide spectrum of functionality from dimensional modelling to data profiling and quality. The OWB 11gR1 release was a move into the database release stack, and included the server components being installed with the database and MDM connectors.

The packaging as part of the Oracle Developer Suite ended in May 2006 with the release of OWB 10gR2 (10g Release 2), when the core functions were included in Oracle 10gR2 Standard Edition and Enterprise Edition.

With the introduction of Oracle 11g in July 2007 the OWB version was updated to 11gR1 (11g Release 1).

Version 11.2 (11g Release 2) was released with the 11gR2 Oracle Database in September 2009. Its features include support for Oracle OBI EE, and native access to an extensible set of non-Oracle platforms using customizable and user-definable code templates.
