= ClickHouse =

Open-source database management system

Clickhouse
- Developers: ClickHouse, Inc.
- Release: June 15, 2016; 10 years ago
- Stable release: v26.10.2.103-stable / October 24, 2026; 8 days ago
- Written in: C++
- Operating system: Linux, FreeBSD, macOS
- License: Apache License 2.0
- Website: clickhouse.com
- Repository: github.com/ClickHouse/ClickHouse

ClickHouse is an open-source column-oriented DBMS (columnar database management system) for online analytical processing (OLAP) that allows users to generate analytical reports using structured query language (SQL) queries in real-time. ClickHouse Inc. is headquartered in the San Francisco Bay Area with the subsidiary, ClickHouse B.V., based in Amsterdam, Netherlands.

ClickHouse, Inc. was incorporated in San Francisco, California, in September 2021 to commercialize the open-source ClickHouse database. The company was initially funded with US$50 million from Index Ventures and Benchmark Capital, with participation from Yandex N.V. and others. On 28 October 2021, the company announced a US$250 million Series B funding round at a valuation of US$2 billion, led by Coatue Management, Altimeter Capital, and others.

In May 2025, ClickHouse raised US$350 million in a Series C funding round led by Khosla Ventures, with participation from BOND, IVP, Battery Ventures, Bessemer Venture Partners, and existing investors including Index Ventures, Lightspeed Venture Partners, GIC, Benchmark Capital, Coatue Management, FirstMark Capital, and Nebius Group. The round valued the company at approximately US$6.35 billion and brought total funding to more than US$650 million.

== History ==
ClickHouse’s technology was first developed at Yandex, Russia's largest technology company. In 2009, Alexey Milovidov and developers started an experimental project to check the hypothesis if it was viable to generate analytical reports in real-time from non-aggregated data that is also constantly added in real-time. The developers spent 3 years to prove this hypothesis, and in 2012 ClickHouse launched in production for the first time to power Yandex.Metrica.

Since ClickHouse became available as open source in 2016, its popularity has grown, as evidenced through adoption by industry-leading companies like Uber, Comcast, eBay, and Cisco. ClickHouse was also implemented at CERN's LHCb experiment to store and process metadata on 10 billion events with over 1000 attributes per event.

=== Acquisitions ===
ClickHouse, Inc. has made the following acquisitions:

- Arctype — October 2022. Arctype's SQL client was integrated into ClickHouse Cloud to provide a web-based interface that formed the basis for the Cloud Console.
- chDB — March 2024. chDB is an in-process OLAP SQL engine that embeds the ClickHouse engine as a library, allowing analytical queries to run inside a host application rather than against a separate server.
- PeerDB — July 2024. PeerDB provides change data capture (CDC) technology that enables replication from PostgreSQL into ClickHouse, expanding real-time analytics capabilities. ClickHouse, Inc. offers a hosted version of PeerDB through ClickPipes, a managed ingestion service for ClickHouse Cloud that supports seamless integration with Postgres sources.
- HyperDX — March 2025. HyperDX is an open-source observability platform built on ClickHouse, providing a user interface and observability tooling that were integrated into ClickHouse's observability stack. HyperDX now serves as the primary UI for ClickStack, an open-source observability stack based on ClickHouse.
- LibreChat — November 2025. LibreChat is an open-source platform that provides a unified chat interface for interacting with large language models. It became part of ClickHouse's open-source "Agentic Data Stack".
- Langfuse — January 2026. Langfuse is an open-source platform for large language model observability, evaluation, and prompt management. The acquisition was announced alongside a US$400 million Series D funding round.

== See also ==
- List of column-oriented DBMSes
