= Sensage =

Sensage, Inc.
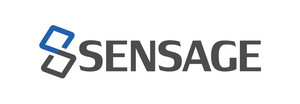
- Company type: Private
- Founded: 2000
- Headquarters: Redwood City, California
- Founder: Adam Sah
- Key people: Jim Pflaging, President and CEO
- Industry: Enterprise Security
- Website: http://www.sensage.com/

Sensage Inc. is a privately held data warehouse software provider headquartered in Redwood City, California. Sensage serves enterprises who use the software to capture and store event data so that it can be consolidated, searched and analyzed to generate reports that detect fraud, analyze performance trends, and comply with government regulations.

According to The451 Group, Sensage generates more than 70% of its revenue through global and local partners, which include EMC, HP, Cerner and McAfee.

The company is backed by venture capital firms Sierra Ventures, Canaan Partners, Mitsui & Co. Venture Partners, FTVentures and Sand Hill Capital.

== Corporate history ==
Sensage Inc. was founded as Addamark Technologies Inc. in 2000. In October 2004, Addamark changed its name to Sensage and simultaneously announced version 3.0 of its flagship security information management product (SIM).

Sensage's financial backers include Sierra Ventures, Canaan Partners, Mitsui & Co. Venture Partners Inc., FTVentures and Sand Hill Capital.

In October, 2012 Sensage was acquired by KEYW Corp. of Hanover, MD. On July 31, KEYW spun off a commercial products division, Hexis Cyber Solutions, Corp. Sensage's product relabeled as HawkEye AP (Analytics Platform) along with the Active Defense Grid product formerly known as Project G, now relabeled HawkEye G are the two primary products marketed by Hexis.

== Technology ==
The company uses a columnar database architecture instead of the relational database architecture that is more common in the industry.

Sensage holds U.S. patent #7,024,414 for parsing table data into columns of values, formatting each column into a data stream, and transferring each data stream to a storage device in a continuous strip of data. In this architecture, the data is stored in columns instead of rows, which eliminates the need for indices when storing event data to increase data compression and retrieval speeds.

The event data warehouse software uses an extraction, transformation and loading tool to pull records into the data warehouse, where it is compressed and spread across server nodes. Data queries are distributed across data warehouse nodes as well.

Sensage provides support for SAP, Oracle (PeopleSoft and Siebel), Lawson, Cerner and other packaged application providers, and its technology supports precise analytics needed for use cases, such as fraud detection.

As its customers have shifted resources into cloud computing platforms, Sensage announced software that supports clustering and configuration in a VMware environment with hypervisor for using CPU cores, memory and other virtualized hardware resources. The event data software includes support for storage virtualization, providing integration of SANs (storage area networks), NAS (network-attached storage) and CAS (content addressable storage) as online storage in a cloud-based or VMware environment.

== Products & Services ==
Sensage's products are built on its event data warehouse software that consolidates a complex stream of business transactions and communications from any network source, analyzes and stores the data, and gives users an interface to search through events from a single console. In 2008, Sensage added new user interface features to its software to make it usable by non-technical staff.

Through much of its history, Sensage customers have used its event data warehouse software to analyze system logs for security information and event management (SIEM) to collect, store, manage and analyze log records for security and forensic purposes. In a survey, Sensage customers reported the need to retain logs and archive archiving records for a minimum of one year as a hedge against future audits. Sensage customer Blue Cross Blue Shield of Florida mentions using Sensage tools for proactive monitoring that allow administrators to see and prevent security threats as they occur.

Sensage has OEM arrangements with HP (the HP Compliance Log Warehouse (CLW) appliance) and Cerner (healthcare applications).HP uses Sensage software as the log management engine in the HP CLW, which is used by customers to collect and analyze log data to trigger compliance reporting for Sarbanes-Oxley, PCI and other federal record retention rules. Customers such as Choice Hotels have deployed the HP CLW to automate network analysis and compliance reporting to meet Payment Card Industry Data Security Standard (PCI DSS) regulations. More than 5,800 Choice brand hotels worldwide rely on the HP CLW to identify internal violations and external threats in real time.

Sensage combines its event data warehouse software with EMC Centera long-term storage units to store, manage and analyze call detail records (CDRs) for telephone and wireless carriers and Internet service providers that must comply with the European Union Data Retention Directive. The regulation was established to ensure service providers could assist law enforcement officials investigating bombings, leading to a requirement to keep records for up to three years.

Telefónica O2 Ireland has deployed Sensage with EMC Centera storage hardware to meet the Data Retention Direction mandate, which requires storage and managing an average of 50 million CDRs per day.
