= OLAP cube =

Multidimensional data array organized for rapid analysis

An example of an OLAP cube

An OLAP cube is a data cube, a multi-dimensional array of data, used for online analytical processing (OLAP), a computer-based technique of analyzing data to look for insights.

== Terminology ==
A cube can be considered a multi-dimensional generalization of a two- or three-dimensional spreadsheet. For example, a company might wish to summarize financial data by product, by time-period, and by city to compare actual and budget expenses. Product, time, city and scenario (actual and budget) are the data's dimensions.

Cube is a shorthand for multidimensional dataset, given that data can have an arbitrary number of dimensions. The term hypercube is sometimes used, especially for data with more than three dimensions. A cube is not a "cube" in the strict mathematical sense, as the sides are not all necessarily equal. But this term is used widely.

A Slice is a term for a subset of the data, generated by picking a value for one dimension and only showing the data for that value (for instance only the data at one point in time). Spreadsheets are only 2-dimensional, so by (continued) slicing or other techniques, it becomes possible to visualize multidimensional data in them.

Each cell of the cube holds a number that represents some measure of the business, such as sales, profits, expenses, budget and forecast.

OLAP data is typically stored in a star schema or snowflake schema in a relational data warehouse or in a special-purpose data management system. Measures are derived from the records in the fact table and dimensions are derived from the dimension tables.

== Hierarchy ==
The elements of a dimension can be organized as a hierarchy, a set of parent-child relationships, typically where a parent member summarizes its children. Parent elements can further be aggregated as the children of another parent.

For example, May 2005's parent is Second Quarter 2005 which is in turn the child of Year 2005. Similarly cities are the children of regions; products roll into product groups and individual expense items into types of expenditure.

== Operations ==
Conceiving data as a cube with hierarchical dimensions leads to conceptually straightforward operations to facilitate analysis. Aligning the data content with a familiar visualization enhances analyst learning and productivity. The user-initiated process of navigating by calling for page displays interactively, through the specification of slices via rotations and drill down/up is sometimes called "slice and dice". Common operations include slice and dice, drill down, roll up, and pivot.

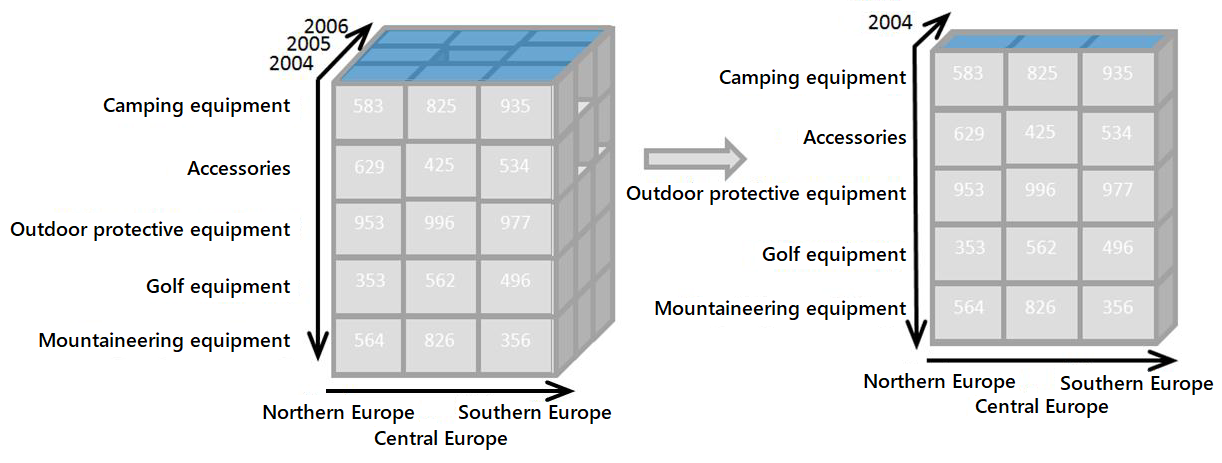
OLAP slicing

Slice is the act of picking a rectangular subset of a cube by choosing a single value for one of its dimensions, creating a new cube with one fewer dimension. The picture shows a slicing operation: The sales figures of all sales regions and all product categories of the company in the year 2005 and 2006 are "sliced" out of the data cube.

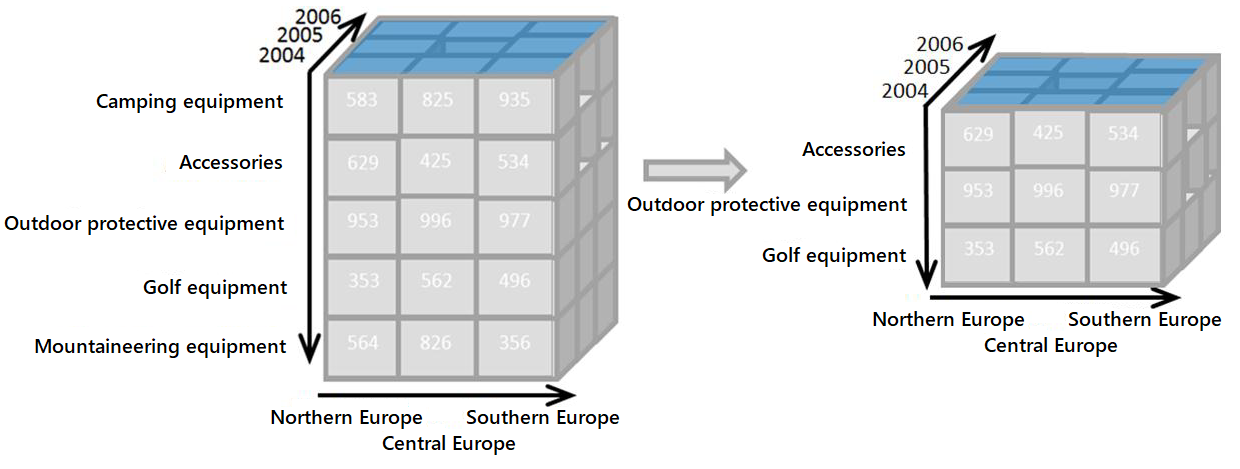
OLAP dicing

Dice: The dice operation produces a subcube by allowing the analyst to pick specific values of multiple dimensions. The picture shows a dicing operation: The new cube shows the sales figures of a limited number of product categories, the time and region dimensions cover the same range as before.

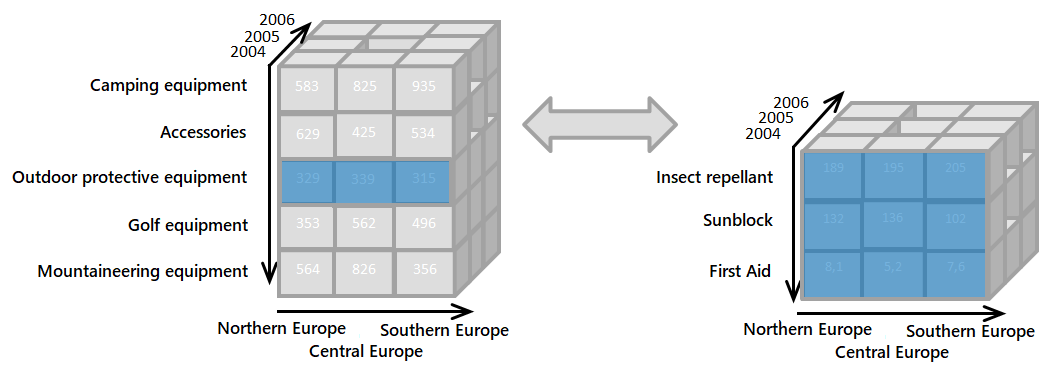
OLAP drill-up and drill-down

Drill Down/Up allows the user to navigate among levels of data ranging from the most summarized (up) to the most detailed (down). The picture shows a drill-down operation: The analyst moves from the summary category "Outdoor protective equipment" to see the sales figures for the individual products.

Roll-up: A roll-up involves summarizing the data along a dimension. The summarization rule might be an aggregate function, such as computing totals along a hierarchy or applying a set of formulas such as "profit = sales - expenses". General aggregation functions may be costly to compute when rolling up: if they cannot be determined from the cells of the cube, they must be computed from the base data, either computing them online (slow) or precomputing them for possible rollouts (large space). Aggregation functions that can be determined from the cells are known as decomposable aggregation functions, and allow efficient computation. For example, it is easy to support COUNT, MAX, MIN, and SUM in OLAP, since these can be computed for each cell of the OLAP cube and then rolled up, since on overall sum (or count etc.) is the sum of sub-sums, but it is difficult to support MEDIAN, as that must be computed for every view separately: the median of a set is not the median of medians of subsets.

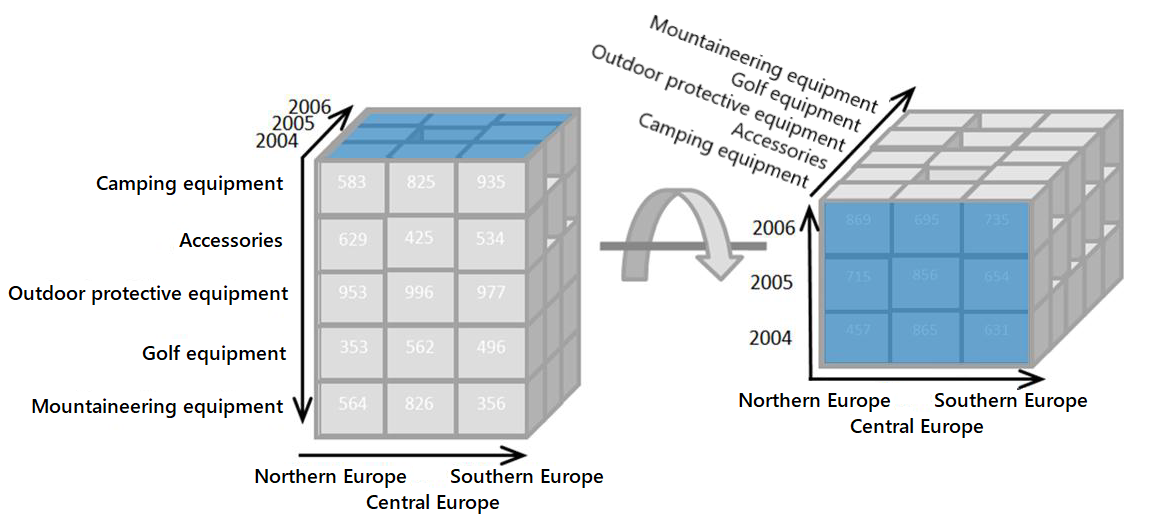
OLAP pivoting

Pivot allows an analyst to rotate the cube in space to see its various faces. For example, cities could be arranged vertically and products horizontally while viewing data for a particular quarter. Pivoting could replace products with time periods to see data across time for a single product.

The picture shows a pivoting operation: The whole cube is rotated, giving another perspective on the data.

== Mathematical definition ==
In database theory, an OLAP cube is an abstract representation of a projection of an RDBMS relation. Given a relation of order N, consider a projection that subtends X, Y, and Z as the key and W as the residual attribute. Characterizing this as a function,

f : (X,Y,Z) → W,

the attributes X, Y, and Z correspond to the axes of the cube, while the W value corresponds to the data element that populates each cell of the cube.

Insofar as two-dimensional output devices cannot readily characterize three dimensions, it is more practical to project "slices" of the data cube (we say project in the classic vector analytic sense of dimensional reduction, not in the SQL sense, although the two are conceptually similar),

g : (X,Y) → W

which may suppress a primary key, but still have some semantic significance, perhaps a slice of the triadic functional representation for a given Z value of interest.

The motivation behind OLAP displays harks back to the cross-tabbed report paradigm of 1980s DBMS, and to earlier contingency tables from 1904. The result is a spreadsheet-style display, where values of X populate row $1; values of Y populate column $A; and values of g : ( X, Y ) → W populate the individual cells at intersections of X-labeled columns and Y-labeled rows, "southeast", so to speak, of $B$2, with $B$2 itself included.

== See also ==
- Business intelligence
- Comparison of OLAP servers
- Data cube
- Data mart
- Data mining
- Data Mining Extensions
- Fast Analysis of Shared Multidimensional Information
- Multidimensional Expressions
- XML for Analysis
