= Apache Kafka =

Software bus for high-volume data feeds

- Original author: LinkedIn
- Developer: Apache Software Foundation
- Release: January 2011; 15 years ago
- Stable release: 4.4.0 / 13 October 2026
- Written in: Scala, Java
- Operating system: Cross-platform
- Type: Stream processing, Message broker
- License: Apache License 2.0
- Website: kafka.apache.org
- Repository: github.com/apache/kafka

Apache Kafka is a distributed event store and stream-processing platform. It is an open-source system developed by the Apache Software Foundation written in Java and Scala. The project aims to provide a unified, high-throughput, low-latency platform for handling real-time data feeds. Kafka can connect to external systems (for data import/export) via Kafka Connect, and provides the Kafka Streams libraries for stream processing applications. Kafka uses a binary TCP-based protocol that is optimized for efficiency and relies on a "message set" abstraction that naturally groups messages together to reduce the overhead of the network roundtrip. This "leads to larger network packets, larger sequential disk operations, contiguous memory blocks [...] which allows Kafka to turn a bursty stream of random message writes into linear writes."

== History ==
Kafka was originally developed at LinkedIn, and was subsequently open sourced in early 2011. Jay Kreps, Neha Narkhede and Jun Rao helped co-create Kafka. Graduation from the Apache Incubator occurred on 23 October 2012. Jay Kreps chose to name the software after the author Franz Kafka because it is "a system optimized for writing", and he liked Kafka's work.

== Operation ==
Apache Kafka is a distributed log-based messaging system that guarantees ordering within individual partitions rather than across the entire topic. Unlike queue-based systems, Kafka retains messages in a durable, append-only log, allowing multiple consumers to read at different offsets. Kafka uses manual offset management, giving consumers control over retries and failure handling. If a consumer fails to process a message, it can delay committing the offset, preventing further progress in that partition while other partitions remain unaffected. This partition-based design enables fault isolation and parallel processing while allowing ordering to be maintained within partitions, depending on consumer handling.

In 2025, Apache Kafka introduced "Queues for Kafka", adding share groups as an alternative to consumer groups. This feature enables queue-like semantics where consumers can cooperatively process records from the same partitions, with individual message acknowledgment and delivery tracking. Unlike traditional consumer groups where partitions are exclusively assigned, share groups allow the number of consumers to exceed partition count, making it ideal for work-queue patterns while maintaining Kafka's durability and scalability benefits. This development addresses the common challenge of "over-partitioning" that many Kafka users face.

== Kafka APIs ==
Kafka Connect (or Connect API) is a framework to import/export data from/to other systems. It was added in the Kafka 0.9.0.0 release and uses the Producer and Consumer API internally. The Connect framework itself executes so-called "connectors" that implement the actual logic to read/write data from other systems.

Kafka Streams (or Streams API) is a stream-processing library written in Java. It was added in the Kafka 0.10.0.0 release. The library allows for the development of stateful stream-processing applications that are scalable, elastic, and fully fault-tolerant. The main API is a stream-processing domain-specific language (DSL) that offers high-level operators like filter, map, grouping, windowing, aggregation, joins, and the notion of tables. Additionally, the Processor API can be used to implement custom operators for a more low-level development approach. The DSL and Processor API can be mixed, too. For stateful stream processing, Kafka Streams uses RocksDB to maintain local operator state. Because RocksDB can write to disk, the maintained state can be larger than available main memory. For fault-tolerance, all updates to local state stores are also written into a topic in the Kafka cluster. This allows recreating state by reading those topics and feed all data into RocksDB.

== See also ==
- RabbitMQ
- Redis
- NATS
- Apache Flink
- Apache Samza
- Apache Spark Streaming
- Data Distribution Service
- Enterprise Integration Patterns
- Enterprise messaging system
- Streaming analytics
- Event-driven SOA
- Hortonworks DataFlow
- Message-oriented middleware
- Service-oriented architecture
