= List of reporting software =

The following is a list of notable report generator software. Reporting software is used to generate human-readable reports from various data sources.

== Commercial software ==
- Actuate Corporation
- BOARD
- Business Objects
- Cognos BI
- Crystal Reports
- CyberQuery
- GoodData
- I-net Crystal-Clear
- InetSoft
- Information Builders' FOCUS and WebFOCUS
- Jaspersoft
- List & Label
- Logi Analytics
- m-Power
- Mark IV
- MATLAB
- MicroStrategy
- Navicat
- OBIEE
- Oracle Discoverer
- Oracle Reports
- Hyperion
- Oracle XML Publisher
- Parasoft DTP
- PolyAnalyst
- Power BI
- Plotly
- Proclarity
- QlikView
- RapidMiner
- Roambi
- RW3 Technologies
- SiSense
- Splunk
- SQL Server Reporting Services
- Stimulsoft Reports
- Style Report
- Tableau
- Targit
- Telerik Reporting
- TIBCO
- Text Control
- Windward Reports
- Zoomdata
- Zoho Analytics (as part of the Zoho Office Suite)

== Free software ==
- BIRT Project
- D3.js
- JasperReports
- KNIME
- LibreOffice Base
- OpenOffice Base
- Pentaho

== See also ==
- Business intelligence software
- List of information graphics software
