= Business intelligence software =

Application software to read and analyze stored data

Business intelligence software is a type of application software designed to retrieve, analyze, transform and report data for business intelligence (BI). The applications generally read data that has been previously stored, often - though not necessarily - in a data warehouse or data mart.

== History ==
=== Development of business intelligence software ===
The first comprehensive business intelligence systems were developed by IBM and Siebel (currently acquired by Oracle) in the period between 1970 and 1990. At the same time, small developer teams were emerging with attractive ideas, and pushing out some of the products companies still use nowadays.

In 1988, specialists and vendors organized a Multiway Data Analysis Consortium in Rome, where they considered making data management and analytics more efficient, and foremost available to smaller and financially restricted businesses. By 2000, there were many professional reporting systems and analytic programs, some owned by top performing software producers in the United States of America.

=== Cloud-hosted business intelligence software ===
In the years after 2000, business intelligence software producers became interested in producing universally applicable BI systems which don’t require expensive installation, and could hence be considered by smaller and midmarket businesses which could not afford on premise maintenance. These aspirations emerged in parallel with the cloud hosting trend, which is how most vendors came to develop independent systems with unrestricted access to information.

From 2006 onwards, the positive effects of cloud-stored information and data management transformed itself to a completely mobile-affectioned one, mostly to the benefit of decentralized and remote teams looking to tweak data or gain full visibility over it out of office. As a response to the large success of fully optimized uni-browser versions, vendors have recently begun releasing mobile-specific product applications for both Android and iOS users. Cloud-hosted data analytics made it possible for companies to categorize and process large volumes of data, which enables unlimited visualization and intelligent decision making.

== Types ==
The key general categories of business intelligence applications are:

- Spreadsheets
- Reporting and querying software: applications that extract, sort, summarize, and present selected data
- Online analytical processing (OLAP)
- Digital dashboards
- Data mining
- Data warehouse
- Local information systems
- Data cleansing

Except for spreadsheets, these tools are provided as standalone applications, suites of applications, components of Enterprise resource planning systems, application programming interfaces or as components of software targeted to a specific industry. The tools are sometimes packaged into data warehouse appliances.

== Open source free products ==
- Apache Hive, hosted by the Apache Software Foundation
- BIRT Project, by the Eclipse Foundation
- D3.js
- JasperReports
- KNIME
- Orange
- Pentaho
- Superset
- Grafana

== Open source commercial products ==
- JasperReports: reporting, analysis, dashboard
- Palo: OLAP server, worksheet server and ETL server
- Pentaho: reporting, analysis, dashboard, data mining and workflow capabilities

== Proprietary free products ==
- Biml - Business Intelligence Markup Language
- InetSoft
- Splunk

== Proprietary products ==
- ActiveReports
- Actuate Corporation
- BOARD
- Comarch
- Crystal Reports
- Data Applied
- Datarails
- Decision Support Panel
- Dimensional Insight
- Domo
- Dundas Data Visualization
- GoodData - cloud-based
- HelpDesk
- Looker Studio - cloud-based
- IBM Cognos
- InetSoft
- Information Builders
- InfoZoom
- JackBe
- Jaspersoft
- Klipfolio
- Lavastorm Analytics
- LIONsolver
- List & Label
- LiveChat
- Logi Analytics
- Looker
- Metatron Discovery
- Microsoft
  - SQL Server Reporting Services
  - SQL Server Analysis Services
  - PerformancePoint Server 2007
  - Proclarity
  - Power Pivot
  - Power BI
- MicroStrategy
- Oracle
  - Hyperion Solutions Corporation
  - Business Intelligence Suite Enterprise Edition
- Panorama Software
- Pentaho (now Hitachi Data Systems)
- Pervasive DataRush
- Plotly
- PolyAnalyst
- Qlik
  - QlikView
  - Qlik Sense
- RapidMiner
- Roambi
- RW3 Technologies
- SAP NetWeaver Business Intelligence
  - Business Objects
- Sisense
- SAS
- Siebel Systems
- Spotfire (now Tibco)
- Sybase IQ (now SAP IQ)
- Tableau Software
- TARGIT Business Intelligence
- Teradata
- WebFOCUS
- Zendesk
- Zoho Analytics (as part of the Zoho Office Suite)
- Zoomdata

== See also ==
- List of reporting software
- OSSIE
