= Metatron (disambiguation) =

Metatron is the name of an angel in Judaism and some branches of Christianity and Islam.

Metatron may also refer to:

== Music ==
- Metatron (Mark Stewart album), 1990
- Metatron (Praxis album), 1994
- Metatron (Darkwell album), 2004
- "Metatron", a song by The Mars Volta on their 2008 album The Bedlam in Goliath
- "Metatron", a song by Carlos Santana on his 2012 album Shape Shifter
- "Metatron", a song by Darkside on their 2013 album Psychic

== Literature ==
- Metatron, a character from the literary trilogy His Dark Materials
- Metatron, a fictional substance mined in Callisto of the Zone of the Enders series

== Film and television ==
- Metatron, the voice of God, a character in the film Dogma, played by Alan Rickman
- Metatron (Supernatural), a recurring character in the television series Supernatural
- Metatron, a character in the series Good Omens, played by Derek Jacobi

== Other ==
- Metatron Discovery, a big data analytics platform developed by SK Telecom

== See also ==
- Megatron (disambiguation)
