= LucidEra =

Software company in California, USA

- Type: Private
- Industry: On-demand software
- Founded: California 2005
- Headquarters: San Mateo, California
- Website: www.lucidera.com

LucidEra was an on-demand (SaaS) business intelligence (BI) software company based in San Mateo, California. It began in 2005 and ceased operations in June 2009.

== History ==
LucidEra was founded in 2005 by Ken Rudin, John Sichi, and Tai Tran. Series A funding was led by Benchmark Capital and Matrix Partners. In 2007, LucidEra secured Series B funding led by Crosslink Capital.

The company's CEO, Ken Rudin, summarizes the vision: "Our ultimate goal is to be to BI what salesforce.com is to CRM and all kinds of transaction applications." (Salesforce.com being a well-known SaaS company).

LucidEra was a privately held company headquartered in San Mateo, California. LucidEra ceased operations in June 2009. Birst, and GoodData offered safe harbor programs for LucidEra customers.

== Technology ==
LucidEra's offering was focused on analytics of CRM and ERP data. However, the analytics applications were not special-purpose built, rather LucidEra developed a generic BI platform, upon which it built vertical solutions.

The company's technology was reliant on open source software such as JBoss, Dojo Toolkit, Mondrian, and software from the Eigenbase Foundation. LucidEra is a key contributor to the LucidDB project, which is hosted by the Eigenbase Foundation. Two of the founders of LucidEra, John Sichi and Tai Tran, are also executives of the Eigenbase Foundation.

Much of the BI technology, particularly the ETL, metadata, and Column-oriented DBMS technology, was based on source code acquired from Broadbase, and was extensively adapted to a modern SaaS architecture.

== Products ==
LucidEra launched its first offering, the forecast to billing application, in March 2007.

LucidSnapShots was released in the summer of 2007.

In the fall of 2007, LucidEra announced availability of Revenue Lifecycle Analysis and Sales Analysis on Salesforce.com's AppExchange.
