= Embedded reporting =

Embedded reporting may refer to:

- Embedded journalism
- Reporting software that is embedded in an application
