= Varigence =

American software company

- Type: Private
- Industry: Computer software, Business intelligence tools
- Founded: 2008
- Founder: Scott Currie
- Headquarters: Greenville, South Carolina, U.S.
- Area served: Global
- Products: Biml, Mist, Vivid
- Website: varigence.com/

Varigence is a software firm headquartered in Greenville, South Carolina, that specializes in the development of business intelligence tools. Varigence is the creator of Business Intelligence Markup Language (Biml).

== History ==
Varigence was founded in 2008 by former Microsoft employee Scott Currie.

In 2009, Varigence released Biml. In October 2011, Varigence held the $10,000 Biml Challenge at the annual PASS Summit in Seattle, Washington. A $10,000 grand prize was given to the person who could complete a business intelligence task the fastest using Biml
