= Jiri Rezac =

British documentary photographer (born 1974)

Jiri Rezac (born 1974) is a British documentary photographer. He was born in the Czech Republic and grew up in Germany. He started his professional career as a news photographer for Reuters News Pictures. His pictures appeared in publications such as National Geographic Books, Vanity Fair, The New Yorker, The New York Times, Der Spiegel, FOCUS Magazine, The Guardian, The Sunday Telegraph and The Times. Rezac also worked for organisations such as Greenpeace and the World Wildlife Fund. He is fluent in German, English, French, Bengali, and Czech.

He met people like Bernie Ecclestone, Tony Blair, James Dyson, Ronnie Wood and Usain Bolt for portrait photography.

His travelling exhibition „Tarnished Earth“ about oilsands in Canada was visited by more than 5 million visitors in two years.

In 2009 he published his first book „empty London“.
