= Text Control =

Software company

- Type: Private
- Industry: Software Development
- Founded: 1991
- Headquarters: Bremen, Germany
- Number of locations: Germany, United States
- Area served: Global
- Brands: TX Text Control, LiveDocx, TX Spell, TX Barcode
- Website: www.textcontrol.com

Text Control is a vendor of word processing and reporting components for Microsoft development technologies. The software company also publishes TX Text Control Express, a free RichTextBox replacement component for the .NET Framework.

Their products are used by developers for integrating word processing and reporting functions in business applications for platforms that include Windows Forms, Windows Presentation Foundation, ActiveX and ASP.NET.

SD Times included Text Control into its SD Times 100 list, which notes "innovators and leaders" in the software development industry, in the category User Experience for 2012–2015, and Components for 2011.

Text Control was founded in 1991. The company (Text Control GmbH), based in Bremen, Germany was established as a corporate spin-off in August 2010 from the company The Imaging Source Europe GmbH. Besides its German headquarters in Bremen, Text Control has offices in Charlotte, North Carolina, United States (dba Text Control, LLC).

== Partnership ==
Text Control is a Microsoft Visual Studio Industry Partner and an Embarcadero Technology Partner.

== See also ==
- List of reporting software
