= Dimensional Insight =

Software company

- Type: Private
- Industry: Business intelligence
- Founded: 1989
- Founder: Frederick A. Powers, CEO; Stanley R. Zanarotti, CTO
- Headquarters: Burlington, MA, USA
- Products: Diver Platform
- Website: dimins.com

Dimensional Insight is a software company that develops business intelligence and analytics software. It was founded in 1989 by Frederick A. Powers and Stanley R. Zanarotti and is headquartered in Burlington, Mass., with offices in the Netherlands and Norway. Its products are used in healthcare, beverage alcohol, manufacturing, and supply chain.

The company's principal product is Diver Platform, which combines data from multiple source systems, applies shared definitions for business measures, and presents the results through dashboards, reports, and an AI assistant. In an April 2025 KLAS Research report on data and analytics platforms, Diver Platform received the highest overall performance score among the vendors evaluated.

== Products ==
Dimensional Insight's flagship product, Diver Platform (Diver), is a business intelligence and analytics suite that allows users to combine multiple internal and external data sources into a single data feed that enables secure, role-based access to data via interactive dashboards and reports. Diver can also be used to send email alerts, to create PDF files, or to download data into Microsoft Excel files.

In addition, Dimensional Insight develops specific applications to meet reporting and analytics needs of both healthcare as well as supplier, manufacture, and distributor organizations. These applications include a revenue and expense tracking tool, productivity analysis tools, and a suite of executive dashboards, as well as physician scorecards, surgery scorecards, and a certified Meaningful Use solution.

The company emerged as the leader in the two top-right quadrants presented in Dresner Advisory Services' Wisdom of Crowds Business Intelligence Market Study in 2020. Diver was awarded first place in the Business Intelligence segment in the 2015 Best in KLAS report. It won Best in KLAS in healthcare business intelligence and analytics again in 2019 and 2020, scoring highly in the report for its corporate culture, customer relationships, and overall value.

== See also ==
- Business intelligence tools
