= Brio Technology =

Former software development company

Brio Technology was a San Francisco Bay area software company cofounded in 1984 by Yorgen Edholm and Katherine Glassey. The company is best known for their business intelligence software systems, starting with DataPivot on the Apple Macintosh. Brio Software was acquired by Hyperion in 2003. Hyperion was in turn acquired by Oracle in 2007. The Hyperion performance management software became the basis of the current Oracle Enterprise Performance Management (EPM) solution which is still offered today as Oracle EPM Cloud. The Brio Technology products were offered as part of the Oracle Business Intelligence (OBIEE) solutions for a time but was eventually deprecated in favour of Oracle's business intelligence solution that was acquired separately from Siebel in 2006. Consequently, the ever shrinking user base of Brio Technology is limited to those customers who purchased Brio products years ago.

== History ==
Brio Technology was founded in San Francisco in 1984 as a consulting company. It made money early by doing contract work for Metaphor Corporation and performing contract programming.

=== Business intelligence software ===
By 1990, Brio had developed its first product, Data Prism, a database query and analysis tool.

The next year, Brio released DataPivot, an innovative program designed to allow regular or sequenced data to be totaled automatically. This was one of the first OLAP software applications. The DataPivot code was later sold in the early 1990s to Borland and integrated into Quattro Pro. The essential idea of DataPivot (pivot tables) was also added to Microsoft Excel a bit later. Also Lotus Improv was built around a similar (though independently created) idea. Brio gained a patent for the idea behind DataPivot ("Cross Tab Analysis and Reporting Method") in 1999.

In 1993, Brio released Data Edit, a tool which allowed more direct manipulation of data in relational databases such as Oracle, Sybase, and DB2.

In 1995, Brio gained some much needed funding from the venture capital firm Kleiner Perkins. Kleiner Perkins insisted on some management changes (co-founder Yorgen Edholm was made the sole CEO of the company) and the ground was laid for taking the company public. Brio went public (former stock symbol of BRIO - Nasdaq) on May 5, 1998.

Flush with money, Brio started looking for businesses to acquire. In order to complement its technology, Brio looked at and later acquired SQRiBE Technologies. SQRiBE was a small company in Palo Alto, CA with reporting (SQR) and a new portal product (ReportMart).

=== Executive changeover ===
However, the merger with the company SQRiBE (also based in the Bay area) in 1999 did not work out well. Although the combined company did reach a record high of revenues in the year 2000 of $150 million (annualized), financial problems were looming. After reporting a net loss for first quarter of 2001, Yorgen Edholm resigned as CEO. Katherine Glassey was forced out of the company a few months later.

Brio hired Craig D. Brennan, a former SVP of Global CRM at Oracle, as its new CEO January 1, 2001. After his first 90 days at Brio, he realized that the company was in worse shape than described by the board. Not only was the Tech Bubble bursting, the economy in a recession, but the merger between Brio and SQRiBE was in name only. There was no vision, strategy, or plan to integrate the two companies. There were either no formal business processes or there were multiple overlapping teams, processes, and so on.

Brennan brought in a new executive team in his first six months and together they came up with a new vision for the company focused on Brio 8, their first integrated Business Intelligence Suite, with a complete redesign from mainframe and client-server to a web-based "zero footprint" architecture.

The company survived the terrible business environment of 2001. The company was required to do two major layoffs in 2001 to reduce its operational losses and to conserve cash. By the end of 2001, the company had achieved cash flow break-even.

Beginning in 2002, the company focused on installing business processes across all functions, dedicated most of its development resources to Brio 8, and managed new maintenance requirements for its most important customers. By the end of the year, the company launched Brio 8 to enthusiastic customers, partners, and press. The company was growing revenue again and had achieved a small profit.

=== Acquisition by Hyperion ===
In 2003, the executive team, working with the board, determined that the Business Intelligence market was going to consolidate and it made sense for the company to consider being acquired. The company focused on both growing its revenue and profitability while also seeking an acquirer. The best fit was Hyperion and over the course of several quarters, Brio Software was acquired and integrated into Hyperion's operations.

A quarter after Hyperion acquired Brio Software, their new integrated capabilities gave them new sales opportunities, and Hyperion achieved YR/YR 30% product growth for several quarters. The Hyperion stock price went from $15 per share to over $50 per share over the next few quarters. In March 2007, Oracle announced that it was acquiring Hyperion, this deal was finalized four months later, in July 2007.
