= Local information systems =

A local information system (LIS) is a form of information system built with business intelligence tools, designed primarily to support geographic reporting. They overlap with some capabilities of geographic information systems (GIS), although their primary function is the reporting of statistical data rather than the analysis of geospatial data. LIS also tend to offer some common knowledge management functionality for storage and retrieval of unstructured data such as documents. They deliver functionality to load, store, analyse and present statistical data that has a strong geographic reference. In most cases the data is structured as indicators and is linked to discrete geographic areas, for example population figures for US counties or numbers claiming unemployment benefit across wards in England. The ability to present this data using data visualization tools like charts and maps is also a core feature of these systems.

The term "LIS" has emerged since 2004, primarily in the UK public sector. To date it is not widely used elsewhere although other terms like community information systems apply to solutions, primarily in North America, that have a great deal of overlap. Another widely used and largely synonymous term is data observatory. Data observatory is a more widely used term internationally particularly within the area of public health where sites which often include this type of statistical reporting application are often termed a health observatory.

The primary application for LIS is to provide a place-focused evidence base that is easily accessible to a wide range of users including data experts, managers, policy makers, front-line staff and citizens. They provide a wide range of statistics and reports allowing users to review the current evidence base and build a picture of localities and neighbourhoods for their area of interest. LIS are commonly used by partnerships where they need to come together to provide joined-up services for a common area. The ability to have a common evidence base and a platform to share sensitive and non-sensitive data is critical in this situation. LIS enables partners to publish a wide range of indicators in the form of defined outputs which combine locally and nationally available data into more meaningful intelligence aimed at specific user groups

== Background ==
In the UK, like many other countries, there has been a rapid growth in the availability of small area statistics. National Neighbourhood Statistics projects across the UK, set up as a result of the PAT 18 report, have opened up access to a wide range of government small area based statistics. This has been accompanied by a gradual shift across the public sector, a shift that remains very much on-going, towards the recognition that policy and decisions should be influenced to a greater degree by evidence. There also continues to be a growing acceptance that some services can be more effectively delivered by targeting resources at specific areas of need − the idea of high demand 'hotspots'. This relies on having reliable and detailed data about the needs of customers, in this case citizens, and where they live, work and take leisure time.

In England in particular this has led to a rapid increase in the number of Local Information Systems particularly within local Authorities and Local Strategic Partnerships. This development has been actively supported by the Department of Communities and Local Government (CLG) under their ‘Neighbourhood Renewal’ agenda. A national research project was funded to identify examples and disseminate best practice – this reported publicly in 2004 and led to a more formal report being published in 2006. CLG's role as a catalyst in this area is further re-enforced through its provision of Neighbourhood Renewal Funds (NRF) - this funding was used by a number of authorities to pump-prime their initial LIS developments.

An initiative is currently on-going through the CLG Information Management Programme to coordinate all LIS activity across local government and partnerships. This has led to regular national LIS meetings and a dedicated LIS forum. To date it is estimated that approximately 50 per cent of top tier authorities in England now have some form of LIS. In some cases these have been built as bespoke solutions, in other cases they are based on off-the-shelf products. Elsewhere within the UK this figure is lower although an initiative has been launched in Scotland in 2009 resulting in a Scottish LIS Toolkit to complement the English version.

== Data ==
The range of data managed within a LIS can be wide and classified in many different ways. Most common is some form of domain specific classification where indicators are grouped into top level categories like ‘Demography’, ‘Health and Welfare’, ‘Crime and Community Safety’, ‘Education and Children's Services’, ‘Environment’ and ‘Economy’. There may also be cross-cutting themes such as ‘Performance’ and ‘Social Disadvantage’. In the UK key government data sources include ONS Neighbourhood Statistics, CLG, Dept for Work and Pensions, NOMIS, Audit Commission and several areas of NHS information services. However the real value of LIS is their ability to combine national data with local data available from a wide range of internal business systems including those of partners. This local data is often not provided to central government and, even when it is, it tends to be in a form that limits its value.

== See also ==
- Information Systems
- Business intelligence tools
- Community indicators
- Geographic Information Systems
- Enterprise Information System
- Knowledge management
- Online analytical processing
- Crime mapping
- Instantatlas
