= Stimulsoft Reports =

Software manufacturer

- Developer: Stimulsoft Company
- Initial release: November 10, 2004
- Stable release: 2026.2.4 (June 10, 2026; 6 days ago) [±]
- Operating system: Microsoft Windows, Linux, MacOS
- Available in: Arabic, Belarusian, Bulgarian, Croatian, Czech, German, English, Spanish, Persian, French, Hungarian, Italian, Georgian, Lithuanian, Dutch, Polish, Portuguese (Brazil), Romanian, Russian, Serbian, Slovak, Swedish, Turkish, Ukrainian, Chinese (Simplified), Chinese (Traditional), Indonesian, Catalan.
- Type: Reporting software
- Website: www.stimulsoft.com

Stimulsoft Company is a software manufacturer in the sphere of Business Intelligence, data analysis, and processing. It develops reporting tools for a variety of platforms while keeping full compatibility between products. Stimulsoft Company provides software for Business Intelligence in the Reporting Tool category.

== Stimulsoft Products ==
Stimulsoft is a company that offers solutions for report creation and viewing, which work on various platforms and devices. For Windows and macOS users, Stimulsoft has standalone applications and specialized components for different technologies.

=== Awards ===
- SQL Server Magazine: A bronze medal winner of the “2008 Editor’s Best Awards”;
- The Tabby Awards /Business 2014 Winner.
- Component Source Top 100 Bestselling Publisher Award 2009-2010;
- Component Source Top 100 Bestselling Publisher Award 2010-2011.
- Component Source Top 100 Bestselling Publisher Award 2011-2012.
- Component Source Top 100 Bestselling Publisher Award 2012-2013.
- Component Source Top 100 Bestselling Publisher Award 2013-2014.
- Component Source Top 100 Bestselling Publisher Award 2014-2015.
- Component Source Top 100 Bestselling Publisher Award 2016.
- Component Source Top 50 Bestselling Publisher Award 2017.
- Component Source Top 50 Bestselling Publisher Award 2018.
- Component Source Top 50 Bestselling Publisher Award 2019.
- Component Source Top 100 Bestselling Publisher Award 2020.
- Component Source Top 50 Bestselling Publisher Award 2021.
- Component Source Top 50 Bestselling Publisher Award 2022.
- Component Source Top 50 Bestselling Publisher Award 2023.
- Component Source Top 25 Bestselling Publisher Award 2024.
