= I-net Crystal-Clear =

i-net Clear Reports (formerly i-net Crystal-Clear)
- Developer: i-net software
- Release: 1999
- Stable release: 11.0 / May 16, 2011
- Written in: Java, .NET
- Operating system: Cross-platform
- Available in: English, German, Spanish
- Type: Reporting software
- License: i-net software EULA
- Website: inetsoftware.de/crystalclear

i-net Clear Reports (formerly known as i-net Crystal-Clear) is a Java-based cross-platform reporting application providing a report designer and a server component to create reports in numerous output formats like PDF, HTML, PS, RTF, XLS, TXT, CSV, SVG, XML, as well as being viewable in a Java applet or Swing component. Application programmers can integrate i-net Clear Reports using the public API which spans over 200 classes. Starting with release 11.0 i-net Clear Reports also supports the .NET programming language and offers a public API for further integration in other products.

== History ==
In Version 11.0 i-net Crystal-Clear was renamed to i-net Clear Reports. At this time it also gained .NET integration as a major feature.

i-net Crystal-Clear was primarily designed to read Crystal Reports templates. It had to be capable of reading the RPT report format and producing a reasonable output. For exporting and saving reasons a new file format had to be created later on, enabling Crystal-Clear to save the API results back and make them editable by a designer.

In 2002 the first version of i-net DesignerXML, the report designer, was written using Java Swing. The editing concept is slightly different from some other designers, using a band-oriented report template format, meaning that reports are designed based on rows of data.

The development efforts have changed in more recent years to a full reporting platform approach, rather than the developer-only, framework-based one.

True to its roots, i-net Crystal-Clear still has the ability to read and execute Crystal Reports report templates up until the latest versions of Crystal Reports.

Unlike Crystal Reports, however, the i-net Crystal-Clear report file format has always been an open format. Until version 9.0 it was an XML format. Since version 9, the report file format is in a zip-based format similar to OpenDocument.

== Flexibility ==
Being a Java application, i-net Clear Reports has the ability to run on a variety of platforms and environments. There is virtually no restriction concerning data sources that can be used, as long as there is a JDBC driver available for accessing the data. For non-JDBC data sources, there are how-to's to write simple mini-drivers. With the new .NET API it got even more flexible and allows integration into .NET based applications.

i-net Clear Reports comes as a standalone server as well as a servlet which can be run on any Java EE application server such as Tomcat, Jetty, IIS, or Apache (via PHP).

Features can be added using the public API, or by adding custom JavaBeans which can be added to reports. User defined functions (UDF) extend the formula features of the embedded formula calculation routines.
