= Godfrey Sullivan =

American technology executive

Godfrey R. Sullivan
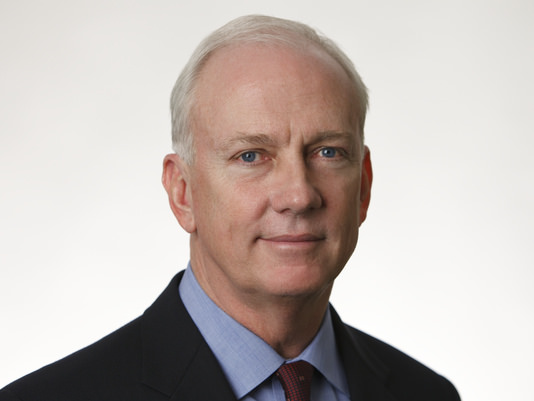
- Born: 1953 or 1954 (age 72–73)
- Education: Baylor University
- Occupations: Former CEO of Splunk and Hyperion Solutions
- Years active: 1981–2015

Godfrey R. Sullivan is the former CEO of data analysis software company Splunk, and of enterprise performance management software company Hyperion Solutions.

== Early life and career ==
Sullivan grew up in Waco, Texas, and earned a Bachelor of Business Administration from Baylor University in 1975. In 1981, he joined Apple Inc., where he worked for 11 years in sales, marketing and operations. In 1992, he moved on to Autodesk, where he worked for eight years under CEO Carol Bartz, and then spent time at Citrix. He served as President of Hyperion Solutions from October 2001 until April 2007, and CEO from July 2004 until April 2007, when the Oracle Corporation acquired the company for $3.3 billion.

In the mid-1980s, Sullivan began participating in Ride and Tie, a mountain race where teams of two people alternate between riding a horse and running. He raced for 25 years, describing it as "probably the most fun I've had with my clothes on," and retired from the sport in 2010 in order to focus on Splunk.

== Splunk ==
Sullivan joined Splunk as CEO in 2008, replacing cofounder Michael Baum in the role, and led Splunk through its initial public offering in 2012. During his tenure at Splunk, the company grew from 750 to more than 10,000 customers, and from $18 million of annual revenue to nearly $600 million. Sullivan advocated for hiring more women within Splunk leadership and the technology sector as a whole. He retired from the CEO position in November 2015, and was succeeded by Splunk SVP Doug Merritt. He continues to serve as chairman of Splunk's board of directors.

In 2019, Sullivan was appointed to the board of directors for San Francisco-based ThousandEyes.
