= Zoomdata =

American software company

- Type: Subsidiary
- Industry: Business intelligence, Computer Software, Data Visualization
- Founded: 2012 (launched 2014)
- Founders: Justin Langseth; Russ Cosentino; Farzad Aref; Jorge Alacron; Jonathan Avila; Igor Semenko
- Fate: Acquired by Logi Analytics
- Headquarters: Reston, Virginia, US
- Area served: Worldwide
- Key people: Nick Halsey (CEO); Russ Cosentino (Co-founder and VP); Ruhollah Farchtchi (CTO)
- Parent: Logi Analytics
- Website: zoomdata.com

Zoomdata is a business intelligence software company that specializes in real-time data visualization of big data, streaming data, and multisource analysis. The company's products are deployable on-prem, in the cloud, and embedded in other applications. SAP Data Visualization by Zoomdata is a SaaS version of Zoomdata for SAP customers. On June 10, 2019, Zoomdata was acquired by Logi Analytics for an undisclosed sum.

== Product and Differentiators ==
Zoomdata sells a data visualization and analytics platform designed for people to explore and analyze vast quantities of data and near-real-time data.

The product is different from other offerings in the business intelligence industry in several ways. One distinction is due to a patent the company holds around "Data Sharpening" to visualize big data. The user's dashboard "sharpens" and becomes clearer as more data is processed, . Matt Asay of readwrite.com compared it to watching a streaming movie, where you see some results immediately, soon followed by the whole. The Zoomdata web software also includes a Data DVR with a "Live mode" feature so dashboard visualizations can be updated in near-real-time, paused, rewinded, and fast-forwarded at different speeds.

Zoomdata claims that their product is intended for business users to explore "modern" data on their own. They claim that unlike traditional business intelligence products that are designed to work with relational databases and are SQL-centric, Zoomdata "Smart Data Connectors" connect to a wide variety of modern data sources and can retrieve data using SQL, native APIs, or a combination of both SQL and native APIs. This allows users to work with data in such disparate systems as search-engine databases like Elasticsearch, big data Hadoop databases like Apache Impala, cloud data warehouses like Snowflake, and more. The company offers several methods of working with multiple databases at the same time, including a data blending feature they call Data Fusion.

Another distinction is that Zoomdata pushes down ad-hoc queries, filters, groupings (aggregations), and even calculations to existing high-performing databases. This is in contrast to solutions that take custody of data in a proprietary system, such as Power BI import and Tableau extract, and is also more open and flexible than Arcadia Data's bet on Hadoop with a tightly coupled, converged BI platform. The company claims that its advanced support for pushdown processing takes advantage of investments in modern, high-performing data platforms, and since data does not need to be moved, extracted, or imported, Zoomdata claims it is more accessible for organizations with regulated, PII (personally identifiable information), proprietary, and other sensitive data that must be tightly monitored for security purposes in a single system.

== Patents and Technology ==
Zoomdata has been granted a number of patents since 2014. Patent US8631325, Real-time data visualization of streaming data, has been cited in patent applications submitted by Apple Inc, Beats Music, Google, and Hewlett-Packard.

Zoomdata claims that their technology is based on standard APIs, a microservices architecture, and the WebSocket communication protocol for real-time interactivity between the web browser and the Zoomdata engine. A Custom Chart CLI can be used to extend the visualization capabilities with custom charts and libraries. If the product's HTML5 web application isn't wanted, the company also offers a JavaScript client and REST APIs that can be used to build custom front-ends to the Zoomdata Query Engine, which provides query scalability, enterprise-level security, and access to the wide variety of Smart Data Connectors.

== Awards and recognition ==
Zoomdata won the 2018 Technology Innovation Award from Dresner Advisory Services in the Big Data Analytics category. Dresner Advisory Services was founded by chief research analyst Howard Dresner, who is credited with coining the term business intelligence in 1989. In 2017, Zoomdata's customer GlaxoSmithKline was a finalist for the Cloudera Fifth Annual Data Impact Award as Rookie of the Year.

In prior years, Zoomdata won the Big Data and Analytics Innovation Award in the annual Hot Tickets competition hosted by The Northern Virginia Technology Council. Zoomdata was also awarded an Information Technology Innovation Award in from Ventana Research in the category of Operational Intelligence and was named a Gartner Cool Vendor in the Cool Vendors In-Memory Computing Technologies, 2016 report by Gartner, Inc. Justin Langseth, co-founder and former CEO, was recognized by Goldman Sachs as one of the 100 Most Intriguing Entrepreneurs of 2016 at its Builders + Innovators Summit.

== Investors ==
In November 2012 Zoomdata announced a $1.1 million seed round with funding from a series of angel investors. In July 2013 Zoomdata raised a $4.1 million Series A round led by Columbus Nova Technology Partners (CNTP) with participation from New Enterprise Associates (NEA), CIT GAP Funds, Razor's Edge Ventures and B7. The company announced a $17 million Series B led by Accel Partners in October 2014 with participation from existing investors NEA, CNTP, Razor's Edge Ventures, and B7.

In February 2016 Zoomdata closed a series C round of funding of $25 million, led by Goldman Sachs. According to Robert J. Terry at Washington Business Journal "Joining Goldman's Principal Strategic Investments Group in the round was new investor Comcast Ventures and previous backers Accel Partners, Columbus Nova Technology Partners and New Enterprise Associates, based in Chevy Chase, Maryland."

== Management ==
Zoomdata's executive management team includes:

- Chairman of the Board: Justin Langseth formerly of Clarabridge and Augaroo
- CEO: Nick Halsey
- CFO: Bob Aldrich
- CTO: Ruhollah Farchtchi
- VP Channel Sales: Russ Cosentino
- VP of Sales: Michael Proia
- VP of Marketing: Robyn Forman
