= Oracle BI Publisher =

- Developer: Oracle Corporation
- Stable release: 11.1.1.7
- Operating system: Linux and Windows
- Type: Oracle database development environment
- License: Oracle Technical Network License (Proprietary)
- Website: Oracle BI Publisher

Oracle BI Publisher (formerly known as Oracle XML Publisher) is an enterprise reporting tool designed by Oracle. It was originally developed to solve the reporting problems faced by Oracle applications. The tool was first released with Oracle E-Business Suite 11.5.10 in 2003. Since then, it has been integrated into many Oracle products, including JD Edwards EnterpriseOne and PeopleSoft Enterprise 9. The tool was also released as a standalone version, with no dependency on other Oracle applications. It was rebranded as Oracle BI Publisher after becoming part of the Oracle Business Intelligence Suite Enterprise Edition.

BI Publisher separates the creation of data from the process of formatting it for different uses. The engine can format any well-formed XML data, allowing integration with any system that can generate XML, including Web Services or any data source available through JDBC. BI Publisher can merge multiple data sources into a single output document.

== Template design ==
BI Publisher report templates can be designed using Microsoft Word, Adobe Acrobat, Microsoft Excel (standalone only) and Adobe Flash (standalone only). Templates created using these tools contain embedded fields with properties that determine how the XML data are merged into the template, using Extensible Stylesheet Language syntax to precisely match the server's engine.

=== Template Builder for Word ===
Template Builder is an extension to Microsoft Word that simplifies the development of Rich Text Format templates. Templates created using Template Builder are transformed into XSL Stylesheets that can be used to generate PDF, RTF, Microsoft Excel, and HTML outputs.

=== Layout Editor ===
Starting with the 11g release, BI Publisher also offers a pure web-based layout editor that allows users to create management reports and simple production reports in a WYSIWYG (What You See Is What You Get) layout editor. The layout editor is written in DHTML (Dynamic Hyper Text Markup Language)

As with Rich Text Format templates, Reports created in the web-based layout editor are transformed into XSL stylesheets and can be viewed in the same output formats. In addition, the layout editor templates (.xpt) can also be viewed in an interactive viewer which allows re-sorting and interactive filtering of existing reports.

=== Adobe Acrobat ===
BI Publisher templates can be designed in Adobe Acrobat 5.0 and above, utilizing the native form field capabilities.

=== Adobe Flash ===
Adobe Flex, a document format by Adobe, is supported within BI Publisher since its 10.1.3.3 release. This allows for the deployment of Flash outputs through the usage of a BI Publisher server.

=== XSL Stylesheet ===
In addition to using the tools mentioned above, users can also upload existing XSL stylesheets to run with BI Publisher.

== Data Template/Model design ==
BI Publisher supports the generation of XML data from SQL queries, web services, XML files and XML HTTP servers, LDAP queries, MDX queries (starting 10.1.3.4.1), Oracle ADF view objects (11g) and Microsoft EXCEL files (11g). While the previous version allowed the simple addition through a UI, linking of queries required the creation of an XML configuration file. In 11g the data model can be created using a web based visual data model builder.

== Server ==
The server is a Java EE application that can be deployed to any Java EE container. The XML data is fed through the templates to produce XSL Formatting Objects, which can be transformed into common output formats, including:

- Portable Document Format
- Rich Text Format
- HTML
- PPT
- Flash
- Plain Text (e.g., EFT/EDI)

=== Delivery Manager ===
The Delivery Manager provides an open architecture that allows custom delivery channels to be implemented which is responsible for delivering the output to different destinations, such as fax and email, with the ability to deliver the same output to different destinations. For example, HTML format can be sent to email while a PDF format can be sent to the printer.

The following protocols are supported:

- SMTP
- Internet Printing Protocol (IPP)
- WebDAV
- FTP
- SFTP
- AS2
