= Northdoor =

Consultancy Company

Northdoor plc
- Type: Public
- Industry: Information technology consulting
- Founded: November 11, 1987
- Founders: Peter Bedells; Robert McKenzie
- Headquarters: London, United Kingdom
- Area served: United Kingdom, Europe, Bermuda
- Key people: Peter Bedells (Chairman); David Ballard (CEO); AJ Thompson (Commercial Director of Enterprise Solutions)
- Total assets: £3,977,056 (2012)
- Number of employees: 100
- Subsidiaries: Northdoor (Ireland) Limited; Linksfield Technologies Limited; Platinum Blue Limited
- Website: www.northdoor.co.uk

Northdoor is a London-based IT consultancy company, which was originally established in 1987, under the name Probedial Ltd. It provides a broad range of IT services to financial and insurance companies in the City of London and elsewhere.

The company's partners include Microsoft, and IBM.

== History ==
In 2005, Northdoor was appointed by Oracle Hyperion to resell their portfolio of business performance management software in the UK and Ireland.

In 2012, Northdoor became the first UK company to designated by IBM as a Power Systems Specialty Partner.

== Products and services ==
=== Northdoor NDEX ===
Northdoor NDEX is an insurance administration solution which is used by customers such as StarStone Insurance Company (previously Torus Insurance Holdings Ltd), and Ark Syndicate Management, for purposes including policy administration.

=== JD Edwards IT Support ===
Northdoor, in partnership with Quistor, provides management of customers' JD Edwards applications.

=== Data management ===
Services are provided to assist clients in the areas of data management, data security, and data analysis using related products including those provided by IBM, and Kalido.

=== Data Security Platform ===
In 2019, Northdoor announced its partnership with cyber security solution provider GeoLang, which enables Northdoor to deliver GeoLang's data security platform.

Also in 2019, Northdoor partnered with the provider of enterprise data protection SaaS Cobalt Iron. Northdoor will be distributing the company's solutions to markets in the U.K. and Ireland. The two companies have also worked together to deliver a presentation on Machine Learning and Data Protection at the 2019 IBM Think Summit in London.
