= Megatron (disambiguation) =

Megatron is the leader of the Decepticons in the Transformers robot superhero franchise.

Megatron may also refer to:

- Variations of the character in the Transformers robot superhero franchise:
  - Megatron (Beast Era), a different character and the leader of the Predacons in Beast Wars and the leader of the Vehicons in Beast Machines
  - Megatronus Prime, the original name of the Fallen
- Megatron (engine), a rebadged BMW turbocharged Formula 1 motor
- "Megatron Man", a 1981 dance single by Patrick Cowley, from the album of the same name
- Megatron (building) (1990–2008), restaurant building in Cambridgeshire
- Megatron (climb), a bouldering route in Colorado
- Meg Griffin, a character in Family Guy, whose legal name is revealed in one episode to be "Megatron"

== Music ==
- "Megatron" (song), a 2019 song by Nicki Minaj
- "Megatron", a 2015 song by Crazy Town from The Brimstone Sluggers
- "Megatron", a 2016 song by Ummet Ozcan

== Nicknames ==
- Calvin Johnson (born 1985), NFL wide receiver for the Detroit Lions (2007–2015)
- DJ Megatron (1978–2011), an American DJ and radio and TV personality (real name Corey McGriff)

== See also ==
- Metatron, an alternate name for Enoch in the Gnostic scriptures
- Cavity magnetron, a high-powered vacuum tube that generates microwaves
- Pegatron, Taiwanese electronics manufacturing company
