= Megatron (building) =

Restaurant in Alconbury, Cambridgeshire, England

Coordinates: 52°22′19″N 0°14′32″W

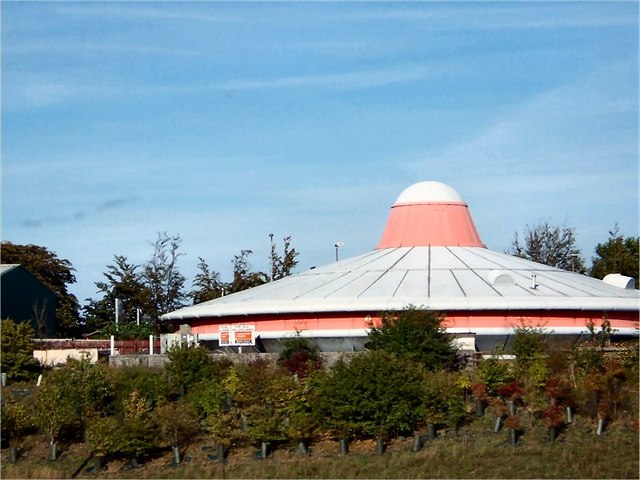
Photograph of the derelict Megatron building taken in 2006

The Megatron was a building just outside the village of Alconbury in Cambridgeshire, UK. It was notable for its flying saucer design and was an example of mimetic architecture. The building was constructed in 1990 and operated as a restaurant until the early 2000s. It was demolished in 2008 despite attempts to have it listed as a significant building.

== History ==
The Megatron was conceived by local businessman Danny Blundell, who developed the idea from 1987 to 1990. He originally planned for it to be the first of a chain of restaurants. The building was designed by Graham Campbell, an architect from Godmanchester, and included innovations such as touchscreen ordering. When the venue first opened in 1990, local residents reportedly thought it was a genuine UFO. Several people reported it to the police, who attended the scene to investigate. The following morning the restaurant was formally opened with TV presenter Andy Crane in attendance. The building's design and fast food menu were intended to appeal to American airmen at RAF Alconbury, an airbase adjacent to the Megatron. Customers were able to pay in both British pounds and US dollars.

Due to high operating costs the venue closed in 1992. Some local people wanted the building to be demolished, believing it to be an eyesore. Instead, it was taken over by McDonald's, who removed much of the original decor and reopened in 1993. It was the only spaceship-shaped McDonald's until another opened in Roswell, New Mexico, in 2005. The McDonald's later closed and the building lay derelict for several years. Huntingdonshire District Council tried to have the building preserved, but this was unsuccessful and it was demolished in 2008.
