= Data Applied =

- Industry: software
- Headquarters: Washington D.C.
- Services: data mining data visualization business intelligence environments.
- Website: www.data-applied.com

Data Applied was a software vendor headquartered in Washington. Founded by a group of former Microsoft employees, the company specialized in data mining, data visualization, and business intelligence environments.

== Products ==
Data Applied implements a collection of visualization tools and algorithms for data analysis and data mining. The product supports several types of analytical tasks, including visual reporting, tree maps, time series forecasting, correlation analysis, outlier detection, decision trees, association rules, clustering, and self-organizing maps.
