= Oracle Business Intelligence Suite Enterprise Edition =

Software owned by Oracle Corporation

- Developer: Oracle Corporation
- Stable release: 11.1.1.7 / April 2, 2013; 13 years ago
- Written in: C++, Java
- Operating system: Windows, Linux, Solaris, HP-UX, AIX
- Available in: Multiple
- Type: Business intelligence Data visualization Analytics; Big data
- License: Proprietary software
- Website: Official website

Oracle Business Intelligence Enterprise Edition Plus, also termed as the OBI EE Plus, is Oracle Corporation's set of business intelligence tools consisting of former Siebel Systems business intelligence and Hyperion Solutions business intelligence offerings.

The industry counterpart and main competitors of OBIEE are Qlik Sense, Tableau Software, Microsoft BI, TIBCO Spotfire, IBM Cognos, SAP AG Business Objects, Looker and SAS Institute Inc. The products currently leverage a common BI Server providing integration among the tools.

== Extensions ==
- OBIA (Oracle Business Intelligence Applications)
- Oracle Scorecard: an implementation of balanced scorecard reporting.

== History ==
- 2000: nQuire formed: Larry Barbetta, President and CEO. Edward Suen, Vice President and CTO.
- 2002: Siebel purchases nQuire.
- 2005: Oracle purchases Siebel (7.8.3.1)
- 2010: 11g Version Released
- 2015: 12c Version Released

== Bibliography ==
- Haroun Khan, Christian Screen, Adrian Ward (July 19, 2012). Oracle Business Intelligence Enterprise Edition 11g: A Hands-On Tutorial (1st ed.). Packt Publishing. ISBN 978-1849685665.
- Darlene Armstrong-Smith, Michael Armstrong-Smith (20 November 2013). Oracle Business Intelligence Discoverer 11g Handbook (1st ed.). Oracle Press. ISBN 978-0071804301.
