= CyberQuery =

Cyberquery is a software product of Cyberscience Corporation Inc. Originally developed for data handling and analysis on Data General AOS and AOS/VS minicomputers, then the available platforms for Cyberquery were extended to all major UNIX platforms, OpenVMS, and Microsoft Windows.

== Description of Cyberquery ==
Invented in 1980, Cyberquery is a declarative "4GL" fourth-generation programming language. Its early design was slightly influenced by RAMIS and other data access and analysis languages such as the query language on GE time sharing systems. Cyberquery automates the process of accessing files or tables and reading records or rows. This basic operation allows the user/developer to concentrate on the details of working with the data within each record, in effect working almost entirely within an implicit program loop that runs for each record. Compared to general-purpose programming languages, this automation allows the user/developer to ignore the technical details of the data and how it is stored, and concentrate on the information contained in the data.

Cyberquery has a data dictionary to describe the datasets users wish to access. This removes all the physical details of the file structure from each program and from the user/developer. The original target customers for Cyberquery were personnel departments, so ease of use by non computer specialists was an early design goal. This architecture had the advantage that Cyberquery is portable, reports written for one database run unmodified on any other provided the underlying data is logically similar. Differences are hidden in the data dictionary. Cyberquery is now widely deployed in Industries including Manufacturing, Finance, Medical and Retail.
