= Roambi =

- Website type: Analytics, Mobile App
- Available in: English
- Website: roambi.com
- Current status: active

Roambi is a business application that changes raw business data into interactive graphics designed for mobile devices on the iOS platform such as Apple Inc.’s iPhone, iPad and iPad Mini. The applications connect to popular information systems including Excel or Salesforce.com and business intelligence systems such as Cognos and corporate databases such as Microsoft SQL. The app is currently used by over 20% of the Fortune 50 and has been downloaded more than 600,000 times.

== Company history ==
MeLLmo Inc. (makers of Roambi) was founded in 2008 by Santiago Becerra, Jaime Zuluaga, David Becerra, and Quinton Alsbury, based in San Diego, California.

The idea for the company came as Santiago Becerra, standing in line to buy his first iPhone in June 2007, realized the business potential of the mobile device. He sought to create a better display for common business data. The goal initially was to create a touch-based data visualization app exclusively for the iPhone. At the time, the iOS App Store was not available to distribute software, so the company found difficulties convincing others of their prospect.

In 2008, before Apple released their first iOS Software Development Kit that allowed people to develop native applications for the iPhone, Roambi was already developing a basic app. The company remained in stealth mode until May 2009, when it launched Roambi on the iPhone as a free app.

When the iPad was announced in January 2010, Roambi decided to develop a new version of the app for the tablet’s launch. Roambi developed the app to leverage the unique aspects of the iPad, such as the larger screen size, and included new analytic features. The app was ready the day the iPad was released in April 2010.

In June 2011, MeLLmo released Roambi Flow, an app that allows users to create and present magazine-style publications on the iPad by integrating text with charts and graphs created in Roambi Analytics.

In June 2013, MeLLmo released "Roambi Business" a secure cloud-based platform. At the same time, the company launched a North American partner program with more than 20 partners trained and certified to work with Roambi Business to sell the service and provide implementation and development services around the application. The program was designed to increase Roambi's engagement and extend its ability to reach end users. The company previously had over 100 partners outside the United States.

On February 16, 2016, SAP announced the acquisition of MeLLmo Inc.

== Description ==
Roambi’s platform allows users to upload their data (from Excel spreadsheets, Salesforce.com, or other data) to the online Roambi Publisher. Users then select from pre-designed templates to deliver the data in different forms (pie chart, graphs etc.)

=== Roambi Analytics ===
MeLLmo's main product, Roambi Analytics, turns business data into visualizations that can be displayed on any iPhone, iPad and iPad Mini.

=== Roambi Flow ===
Roambi Flow is used to create and present magazine style publications on the iPad by combining analytics with text and other rich media content. The product allows for point-and-click editing, as well as embedded data, and PDF importing capabilities. Flow was showcased in May 2011 and officially launched in June 2011. The product was used by Stanford University for their online student magazine. Flow can embed content, including text, images and graphics, to provide content for a presentation or briefing book, or to create digital publications on a routine basis.

=== Roambi ES ===
Roambi ES is secure server software that is typically deployed on-premises or in a private hosted cloud, like Amazon Web Services. The software is designed for large companies and can change business reports and data into analytics. The software interconnects with multiple systems, enables publishing capabilities and enforces the right security policies to Roambi files that can be viewed by Roambi Analytics and Flow apps. Roambi ES can be installed in an on-premises or private cloud environment, like Amazon AWS.

=== Roambi Business ===
In June 2013, MeLLmo launched a cloud-based version named "Roambi Business". The product was created to offer the app to a wider array of business, particularly small businesses, giving them the same tools used by large corporations. The service is hosted on Amazon Web Services, and features a publishing API, single sign-on with SAML 2.0, offline access and administrative capabilities, including remote wipe, file expiration, application passcodes and file recall. The platform supports data analysis no matter where the data exists—"whether it's Excel spreadsheets, CRM systems, databases or traditional business intelligence systems" — and without requiring substantial investment within platform that hosts the data.

== Reception ==
The app has eight of the top 10 largest pharmaceutical and biotech companies in the world as clients; as well as Siemens, the Dallas Cowboys, ABB, Telstra, Henkel, the Sydney Airport, and DBRS. Life Technologies bought 900 iPads in early 2012 in order to equip their salespeople with Roambi in order to better understand the data they collect.

The day the iPad was released, Roambi was featured on the first page of the Business category in the App Store, Apple Inc. chose to continue highlighting Roambi on their homepage afterwards.

In 2011, Roambi won the CTIA E-Tech Award for "General Business". The same year, CNN Money named Roambi one of the "5 Best Apps for Business."

Roambi was chosen by the South African government in 2011 to help display and make sense of the country’s census results.
