= Data source =

A data source may refer to:

- Database
  - Datasource, a special name for the connection set up to a database from a server in the Java software platform
- Computer file
- Data stream
