= Decision Support Panel =

Decision Support Panel AB
- Type: Private
- Industry: Business intelligence, business analysis, software
- Founded: 1999
- Headquarters: Stockholm, Sweden
- Key people: Jan Morath, CEO; Håkan Ebersjö, SVP Sales; Hervé Capo, CTO; Errah Seno, Marketing Manager
- Products: Performance Canvas

DSPanel AB (earlier Decision Support Panel AB) is a software publisher based in Stockholm, Sweden. Founded in 1999, it markets Microsoft Office-based Enterprise Performance Management and business intelligence software.

== About ==
DSPanel AB, founded in 1999, markets Microsoft Office-based Enterprise Performance Management and business intelligence software. Presently, DSPanel continues to provide software and partner with other companies from different sectors such as Hospitality and Entertainment, Manufacturing, Distribution, Retail, Services, Health care. DSPanel also collaborates with original equipment manufacturers to attain a wider reach of its products – Epicor, Cadeia, Évry, and STC.

In 1999, the first product DSP Outlook Edition was developed. Today, it is still being used by over 800 customers worldwide and the newer versions of Performance Canvas product primarily used by OEMs that embed it in their products.

In 2007, DSPanel launched a new generation of tools under the name “Performance Canvas” where the information worker is now mobile and the technology utilized is pervasive and diverse with the Microsoft BI stack enhanced. This generation of Performance Canvas products removed the Microsoft SharePoint requirement and broadened support for data sources to include IBM Cubing Services, SAP Business Warehouse, and relational data sources from various vendors.

In 2013, DSPanel focused on providing Financial Enterprise Performance Management including budgets, forecasts, reports, as well as Key Performance Indicators.

In 2014, DSPanel offers a series of Performance Canvas products such as:

- pcMobile
- pcFinancials – Microsoft based Planning, Budgeting, Reporting, and Consolidating tool.
- pcLegal
- Portal Edition
- pcAppCloud
- EFP – sold by Epicor

In 2015, Significant changes are introduced to their pcFinancials product. AR/AP modules may now also be added on top of its pre-built planning, budgeting, and reporting tool.
