= Embedded analytics =

Type of analytics

Embedded analytics enables organisations to integrate analytics capabilities into their own, often software as a service, applications, portals, or websites. This differs from embedded software and web analytics (also commonly known as product analytics).

This integration typically provides contextual insights, quickly, easily and conveniently accessible since these insights should be present on the web page right next to the other, operational, parts of the host application. Insights are provided through interactive data visualisations, such as charts, diagrams, filters, gauges, maps and tables often in combination as dashboards embedded within the system. This setup enables easier, in-depth data analysis without the need to switch and log in between multiple applications. Embedded analytics is also known as customer facing analytics.

Embedded analytics is the integration of analytic capabilities into a host, typically browser-based, business-to-business, software as a service, application. These analytic capabilities would typically be relevant and contextual to the use-case of the host application.

== History ==
The term "embedded analytics" was first used by Howard Dresner: consultant, author, former Gartner analyst and inventor of the term "business intelligence" said Howard Dresner while he was working for Hyperion Solutions, a company that Oracle bought in 2007. Oracle started then to use the term "embedded analytics" at their press release for Oracle Rapid Planning on 2009.

== Considerations with embedded analytics ==
When evaluating embedding analytics, consideration would normally be given to integration at various levels, these would likely include: security integration, data integration, application logic integration, business rules integration, and user experience integration.

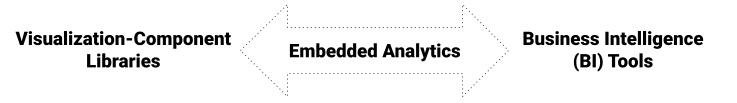
The spectrum of options for embedded analytics

This is in contrast to traditional BI, which expects users to leave their workflow applications to look at data insights in a separate set of tools. This immediacy makes embedded analytics much more intuitive and likely to be valued by users. A December 2016 report from Nucleus Research found that using BI tools, which require toggling between applications, can take up as much as 1–2 hours of an employee's time each week, whereas embedded analytics eliminate the need to toggle between apps.
