= List & Label =

Software development reporting tool

- Developer: combit GmbH
- Release: 1992; 34 years ago
- Stable release: 32 / 16 October 2026; 34 days ago
- Operating system: Microsoft Windows Linux
- Available in: English, German, French, Dutch, Czech, Italian, Portuguese, Spanish, Slovak, Japanese, Simplified Chinese
- Type: Reporting software
- License: Proprietary
- Website: www.combit.com

List & Label is a professional reporting tool for software developers. It provides comprehensive design, print and export functions. The software component runs on Microsoft Windows and can be implemented in desktop, cloud and web applications. List & Label can be used to create user-defined dashboards, lists, invoices, forms and labels. It supports many development environments, frameworks and programming languages such as Microsoft Visual Studio, Embarcadero RAD Studio, .NET Framework, .NET Core, ASP.NET, C++, Delphi, Java, C Sharp and some more. List & Label either retrieves data from various sources via data binding, or works database independent. Reports are designed and created in the so-called List & Label Designer and then exported into a multitude of formats like PDF, Excel, XHTML and RTF. Since version 27 a web report designer for ASP.NET MVC is available.

== History ==
The product was first released in 1992 by combit. The current version is 30. A new major version of List & Label is released every fall, usually in October. Updates are available several times a year via Service Pack.

== Features ==
=== Report Designer ===
The Designer enables users to graphically layout the report. It offers report objects such as tables, charts, crosstabs, gauges, HTML, conditionally formatted text, barcodes, matrix codes, and graphics, and is extensible using third-party add-ons. User applications can interact with the report via the programmable object model of the report. The real-time preview functionality allows users to view changes instantly.

Usability features include layer and appearance management, enabling conditional logic to dynamically control the visibility of objects in reports. The Designer also supports the inclusion of multiple report containers in a single project, accommodating complex layouts such as parallel tables and charts.

A formula wizard and support for scripting languages such as C# facilitate advanced calculations and logic. The Designer's object model (DOM) provides developers with the ability to modify layouts and behaviors programmatically.

=== Web Report Designer ===
The web report designer works browser-based and independent from printer drivers and spoolers - that makes deployments to the cloud easier. Just like the use of the Visual Studio deployment pipeline.

=== Data Sources ===
Depending on the programming language, the product offers automatic support for data sources:

- Databases such as Microsoft SQL Server, Oracle, MySQL, PostgreSQL, IBM Db2, SQLite, MariaDB, MongoDB, Cosmos DB
- XML data, CSV
- Business objects
- Data sources that can be accessed via OLE DB, ODBC or ADO.NET
- LINQ data and data from web services
- GraphQL

Additionally, the product offers support for unbound data and can be extended to support other data sources via interfaces.

=== Output Options ===
- Printer
- Image Formats (JPEG, BMP, EMF, TIFF, PNG, SVG, HEIF, WebP)
- Document Formats: PDF, PDF/A, Word (DOCX), Excel (XLS), PowerPoint (PPTX)
- HTML, XHTML, MHTML
- Barcodes
- Plain Text, RTF, CSV, JSON
- XML, ZIP, Email, JSON
- List & Label preview file

=== Target Audience ===
List & Label can be used in Windows development environments. While it competes most notably on the Microsoft .NET platform with other products such as Crystal Reports, SQL Server Reporting Services, ActiveReports, there are few competing products for other programming languages (e.g. Progress, Alaska Xbase++, Visual DataFlex).

== Awards ==
- Reader's Choice Award 2005–2008
- Stevie Awards 2021: Best Technology for Data Visualization
- Top 100 Publisher Award Component Source 2013-2014, 2014-2015,2016, 2018, 2019, 2020, 2021, 2022
