= Datarails =

American multinational software development company

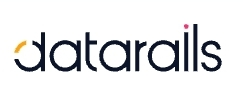
- Type: Privately held company
- Industry: Financial technology
- Founded: 2015; 11 years ago
- Founders: Didi Gurfinkel, Eyal Cohen, and Oded Har-Tal
- Headquarters: New York, US
- Number of employees: 320 (2026)
- Website: datarails.com

Datarails is a financial technology company that provides FinanceOS, a finance operating system for consolidating and governing financial data, making it ready for use with AI tools. Founded in 2015, the company is headquartered in New York City and is incorporated in Delaware.

== History ==
Datarails was founded in 2015 as an Excel-connected FP&A solution by Didi Gurfinkel (CEO), Eyal Cohen (COO) and Oded Har-Tal (CTO).

In June 2021, the company raised US$55 million in Series A funding led by Israeli investor Zeev Ventures, with participation from Vertex Ventures, Innovation Endeavors, and Vintage Investment Partners. It completed its Series B in March 2022 and raised another $50 million led by Israel's Qumra Capital, who were joined by La Maison Partners, and Claltech.

In January 2026, Datarails raised $70 million in a Series C round led by the growth equity firm One Peak, with participation from existing investors, bringing total funding since its founding to $175 million. The round valued the company at approximately $550 million.

== Product and services ==
Datarails’ core product is FinanceOS, a platform the company describes as a finance operating system that consolidates data from enterprise resource planning (ERP), customer relationship management (CRM), human resource information systems (HRIS), and bank accounts, alongside Microsoft Excel.

The platform is designed to let Excel continue to serve as the user interface while FinanceOS operates as the underlying data layer, connecting to more than 600 native system connectors without requiring companies to replace existing software.

Datarails uses AI and machine learning within FinanceOS to support real-time financial consolidation and data visualization, and the company holds patents for its Excel-to-database transformation technology.

FinanceOS supports functions including financial planning and analysis, month-end close, cash management and spend control.

In 2024, Datarails introduced a cash management product for finance teams.

In 2025, the company launched a spend control module.

In 2026, the company introduced AI finance agents for strategy, planning and reporting, designed to use consolidated company data to generate finance-related outputs.

In March 2026, Datarails launched FinanceOS, its Finance Operating System, described as the governed foundation that connects financial data, business logic, workflows, applications and AI across the Office of the CFO.

== Recognition ==
In October, 2022, Datarails won The Most Promising Startup Award in the category of B2B and Cybersecurity from tech news site The Information.

Datarails was ranked 92nd on the 2024 Deloitte Technology Fast 500 list of fast-growing companies in North America, and 113th on the 2025 list.

In 2023, the company was included on the Inc. 5000 list of fast-growing private companies in the United States, and a Power Partner. Datarails was also included in the list in 2024, 2025, and 2026.

In August 2024 BBB National Programs’ National Advertising Division recommended that Datarails clearly disclose its connection to The Finance Weekly website.

In April 2026, Datarails was announced as a winner of the Newsweek AI Impact Awards, in the Extraordinary Impact in Commercial Tool or Service category.

== Publications ==
Datarails releases several annual reports such as The CFO’s Office 2.0 which has been cited in news sites including Financial Times, Fortune, and Forbes.

Datarails’ annual CFO Sentiments survey is also released annually and has been covered by media including CFO Dive.
