= InetSoft =

Multinational software company

InetSoft Technology Corporation
- Type: Privately Owned
- Industry: Business intelligence tools
- Founded: 1996; 30 years ago
- Founders: Larry and Luke Liang
- Headquarters: Piscataway, New Jersey, United States
- Key people: Luke Liang, Co-Founder and CEO; Larry Liang, Co-Founder and Chief Systems Architect; Mark Flaherty CMO; Rajiv Subramanian CSO
- Website: inetsoft.com

InetSoft Technology Corporation is a privately owned multinational computer software company that develops free and commercial web-based business intelligence applications. The company was founded in 1996, and currently has over 120 employees between its corporate headquarters in Piscataway, New Jersey, and development offices in Beijing and Xi'an, China.

The company offers applications focusing on operational BI, enterprise reporting, data visualization and embeddable reporting. InetSoft's solutions have been deployed at over 3,000 organizations worldwide, including 25% of Fortune 500 companies.

== History ==
InetSoft was co-founded in 1996 by siblings Larry and Luke Liang. Prior to founding InetSoft, Larry Liang, was involved in the early research of e-commerce and interactive Web technologies and served as a research scientist at Bell Communications Research (now Telcordia Technologies), and held various technical positions at Bell Labs, AT&T, and Lucent Technologies. Luke Liang worked for Goldman Sachs in a variety of technology and management positions and held consulting positions with both JP Morgan, Chase and the Union Bank of Switzerland. Both hold master's degrees in Computer Science.

The company began with four employees working out of a garage in Piscataway, New Jersey. It focused on developing an open standards Java-based platform that would be fully compatible with Java/XML, relational databases, internet technologies and legacy systems. Its initial product was Style Report, which focused on reporting and data analysis. Style Report claims to have a small footprint, and has been used in client-side and server-side Java applications. Over the years, InetSoft's products evolved alongside Java to become server-based Web solutions. The product line has grown to include reporting, dashboards and visual analysis.

== Product development history ==
InetSoft's software is based on open standards technology that incorporates XML, SOAP, Java language, and JavaScript. While the primary design goal is easy integration with other open standards based software, access to third party proprietary software has been added in recent years. Additionally, the company licenses by CPU rather than by named user. Here is a history of InetSoft product development.

- 1998: Style Report was introduced, a developer tool that could be used as a report generation engine for both desktop Java applications and web applications. It provided support for tabular, flow, "banded" (like Crystal Reports), and mixed layouts. Its embedded report scripting engine was the Mozilla Rhino engine.
- 2000: Style Report EE was introduced. It was based on the same reporting engine and provided multi-threaded report generation with caching, drill-down reports, parameter reports, and search, sort and filtering features. It also featured ad hoc query for modifying or creating reports.
- 2004: Style Report Analytic was introduced. It was a product for operational BI that provided reports, dashboards, OLAP, a balanced scorecard, and alerts. It used patent-pending "Data Block technology" for accessing disparate data sources, a process known as "data mashup".
- 2007: Style Scope and Style Intelligence were introduced. Style Scope was a web-based dashboard design product that used Adobe Flex to deliver a Rich Internet application. Style Intelligence offered dashboards, reporting, and analysis.
- 2008: InetSoft began to offer BI on-demand and a Software-as-a-Service (SaaS) solution for Salesforce.com. The service added interactive dashboards and visual analysis features for existing Salesforce.com users.
- 2009: Visualize Free and Style Chart free hosted services were introduced. Visualize Free provided multi-dimensional visual analysis. Style Chart provided an embeddable AJAX charting engine.
- 2010: Style Intelligence 10.3 and Style Scope Free Edition were released. The updated Style Intelligence release increased geographic data binding capabilities and added data access for the following enterprise resource planning (ERP) applications: SAP AG, Siebel Systems, JD Edwards, and PeopleSoft. Style Scope Free Edition was a free downloadable server for dashboards and visualization.
- 2011: Style Intelligence 11.0 was released. New features include the Style Studio which unifies the developer and administration tools for data mashups, report and dashboard design. The 11.1 release added support for Apple® iOS devices via HTML 5, as well as post aggregate computations.
- 2012: Style Intelligence 11.3 was released. New features include Freehand Tables in Viewsheets, Google Map Integration, Remote Report Execution in Style Studio, Individual Asset Export in Style Studio, Individual Chart Export in Viewsheet, Input-Based Shared Filters in Viewsheet, and over 80 more enhancements.
- 2013: Style Intelligence 11.4 was released. New features include Viewsheet Annotation, Shared Bookmarks, Discrete Measure Representation, Independent Visual Binding for Chart Measures, Dynamic Sorting for Viewsheet Chart Axes, Screen Layout Guide for Viewsheets, Data Model Validation Checking, Metadata Refresh for Individual Data Sources, Restructured Tabs in Enterprise Manager, Worksheet Organization in Enterprise Manager, Script Access to Viewsheet Component Position, Search Access to Non-Archived Reports, and Depreciation of Portlet Dashboards.
- 2015: Style Intelligence 12.1 was released. New features include Mobile Layout Designer, Shareable Design Style Options, UI Refresh.
- 2016: Style Intelligence 12.2 was released. New features include Full HTML5 Browser Client Support, Spark Foundation for Big Data Analytics.

== Product awards ==
InetSoft Style Report won Best Java Reporting Tool in 1999, 2000, 2002, 2003, 2005, 2006, and in 2007. Also in 2007, InetSoft's Style Report Analytic Edition won Best Java Business Intelligence Tool, the first year it had been nominated and the final year of the JDJ Awards program.

In 2011, InetSoft was named to Information Management's list of top "40 Vendors We're Watching in 2011" for its Style Intelligence 11.0 release and patent pending "Data Block technology".

== Current product lines ==
=== Commercial products ===
- Style Intelligence is InetSoft's main business intelligence platform. It provides a visualization-driven approach to reporting, dashboards, and visual analysis.
- Style Scope is an edition of Style Intelligence that includes the patent-pending "Data Block technology" that is focused on interactive visualization, plus monitoring and analytic dashboards.
- Style Report Enterprise is an edition of Style Intelligence that focuses on enterprise reporting. It delivers carefully formatted information to a wide business user community.

=== Free applications ===
- Style Scope Agile Edition is a small-footprint server that delivers Web-based interactive dashboards, using the (deprecated) Flash and visualizations that can be shared within an organization. It provides support for multi-source data mashups and admin and permission controls.
- Visualize Free is a visual analysis application that allows users to explore their own data visually and interactively. It requires no software installation.
- Style Chart is a charting engine and JavaScript API for Web developers to embed charts and graphs in Web pages via AJAX.
