= Information Builders =

American software company

Information Builders (ibi)
- Type: Private
- Industry: Software and consulting
- Founded: 1975 in United States
- Headquarters: New York City, United States
- Key people: Gerald D. Cohen, founder Frank J. Vella, CEO
- Products: WebFOCUS; FOCUS iWay Software integration technology
- Revenue: US$315 million (2007)
- Number of employees: 1,400 (2007)

Information Builders (ibi), founded in 1975, was a privately held software company headquartered in New York City. Information Builders (ibi) provided services in the fields of Business Intelligence, Data Integration and Data Quality solutions.

== History ==
Gerald D. Cohen, who died in 2020, co-founded Information Builders (ibi) in 1975 with Peter Mittelman and Martin B. Slagowitz. Their initial product, FOCUS, was designed to enable people without formal computer programming skills to work with information systems.

Information Builders (ibi) was one of the largest privately held software firms, operating in more than 60 locations. Computer Intelligence estimated in 1987 that Information Builders had 3% of the Fortune 1000 PC database market, tied for third behind Ashton-Tate and Microrim. In 2001, it established iWay Software, a wholly owned company focusing on data integration and service-oriented architecture (SOA).

In October 2020, TIBCO Software agreed to purchase ibi. The deal was completed in March 2021.
