= RW3 Technologies =

RW3 Technologies, Inc.
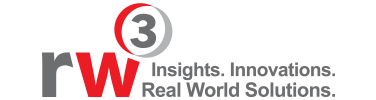
- Type: Privately held company
- Industry: Software, SaaS, consumer packaged goods
- Founded: 1992
- Founder: Bruce Nagle
- Headquarters: Bay Area, California, USA
- Key people: Bruce Nagle (President & CEO); Cameron Flores (VP of Operations); Matthew Stamport (Chief Architect); Andrew Cannon (Controller/Account Manager); Laney Tulli (Senior Account Manager)
- Products: MarketCheck, SmartCall, The BI Suite and PriceCheck
- Services: CPG Field Sales, Mobile Reporting, Custom Applications
- Number of employees: 45
- Website: rw3.com

RW3 Technologies is a software company that provides SaaS Intelligent in store execution, data driven field sales, survey, Dashboard/reporting consumer packaged goods (CPG) industryand Online — Instore Competitive Pricing to Retailers. It is headquartered in Austin Texas. It was acquired by Blue Ocean Software in 2025.

== History ==
RW3 Technologies was founded in the Bay Area by Bruce Nagle in 1992. The company's primary focus was to streamline daily data entry processes for the sales industry.

In 1992, RW3 introduced one of the first Land-Line CPG broker sales systems that allowed for mobile data entry. It was initially used in food brokerage, though eventually expanded to include functionality for the consumer packaged goods industry.

In 2000, the company expanded its business model to include business-to-business account management.

In 2010, the company began development of their first general SaaS product application since the late 1990s; the SaaS application called InStore Mobile (now MarketCheck) was released in 2011. The in-store survey application allows for two-way communication between the account rep and broker, allowing organizations to improve and track retail conditions.

In 2013, RW3 released the BI Suite, a business intelligence environment that enables organizations to create views across departments and utilize multiple data sources to align sales strategies.

In 2014 Smartcall was launched and marketed to the CPG industry. The application enables field sales reps to conduct traditional store calls and manage sales routes. It is packaged with MarketCheck into their InStore Execution Suite, providing retail execution and monitoring applications for the consumer goods industry.

== Products ==
RW3 offers four SaaS products for the retail, wholesale, and B2B industries:

- MarketCheck - An application designed around the workflow of a field manager; enables users to access sales and analytics and other tools to help manage their brokers.
- SmartCall - An application designed around the workflow of a direct rep; enables users to organize their routes and daily activities.
- The BI Suite - A business intelligence environment that provides teams with device-agnostic reports and custom dashboards.
- PriceCheck - A mobile data collection application that allows reps to collect in-store pricing and validate it with a two-stage data validation process.

== Markets ==
RW3 serves three primary markets:

- Small to Blue Chip CPG Manufactures
- CPG Marketing Merchandisers and Brokers
- Small to Blue Chip Retailers

== Awards ==
- In 2015, RW3 was recognized by readers of Consumer Goods Technology magazine as a A Best-In-Class Service Provider of Retail Execution.
- In 2012, RW3 Technologies was named the Consumer Goods Technology Readers’ Choice Award Winner for #1 CRM Customer Experience.
- In 2009, RW3 Technologies was ranked by Consumer Goods Technology as One of the Top 27 Companies to Consider.
- In 2007, RW3 Technologies was awarded by Consumer Goods Technology the Outside The Box Industry Award, presented to vendors that just don't fit within today's business walls.
- In 2004, RW3 Technologies was ranked in the Top 50 Fastest Growing Companies, by the East Bay Business Times.
