= Logi Analytics =

Software developer

Logi Analytics by insightsoftware.
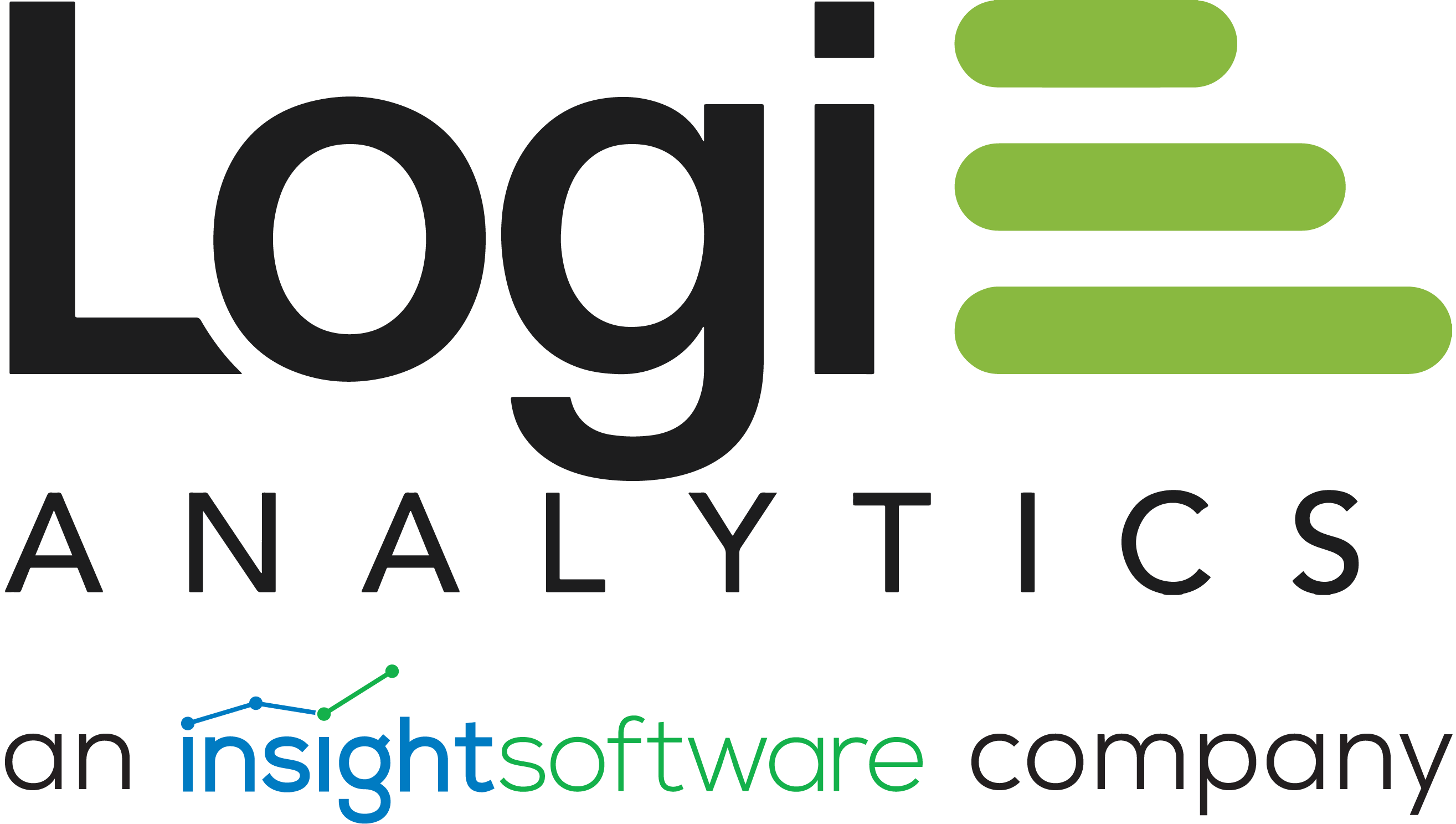
- Industry: Business intelligence, Business Analytics, Data discovery, Embedded analytics
- Founded: 2000
- Headquarters: Raleigh, NC, USA
- Owner: insightsoftware
- Website: insightsoftware.com

Logi Analytics, Inc. was a computer software company headquartered in McLean, Virginia, United States, with additional offices in the UK and Ireland. The company developed embedded analytics and data visualization tools for business intelligence applications.

In April 2021, Logi Analytics was acquired by insightsoftware, and now operates as part of its Data & Analytics business unit. Its flagship offering, Logi Symphony, integrates capabilities from former Logi Analytics products along with Dundas BI from Dundas Data Visualization technology to provide a unified platform for embedded business intelligence and AI-powered analytics.

== History ==
Logi Analytics, formerly LogiXML, was founded in 2000 by Arman Eshraghi, a software development and architecture professional. The company claims its mission is "to help application teams create smarter software."

In 2000, Logi Analytics developed LGX AppDev, an XML-based engine that built Web applications and evolved to address the specific task of report-building for BI. Logi Report (then called LGX Report), the first engine-driven, XML-based reporting application. Between 2002 and 2004, more features were added to Logi Report until Eshraghi made the decision to brand the full-featured version separately - as Logi Info - and offer the basic version free of charge.

Then in 2004, Logi Analytics began marketing Logi Report as a free Web-based BI reporting tool. The product was renamed Logi Report or Freereporting.com.

In 2006, Logi Analytics discontinued the LGX branding and introduced the Logi product line, consisting of applications for ad hoc, managed and OLAP reporting, an embedded database to be used between operational databases and reporting servers, and a connector pack for integration of commonly used Web-based sources into the Logi reporting environment. They also started to expand internationally, partnering firstly with Nano Blue in AsiaPac, then Intenda in EMEA.

In 2008, Logi Analytics streamlined its commercial product offering, concentrating on Logi Info (managed reporting, analysis and dashboarding), Logi Ad Hoc (ad hoc reporting, analysis and dashboarding), and the Logi 9 platform (Web-based BI platform including managed and ad hoc reporting, analysis, dashboarding and data integration).

The company changed its name to Logi Analytics in March, 2013.

In October 2013, Logi Analytics received a $27.5 million growth equity investment led by new investor LLR Partners. Updata Partners also participated in the round. The company previously raised $23.1 million from Updata Partners, Grotech Ventures and Summit Partners, who remain invested in the company.

In 2014, Logi Analytics introduced its data discovery product, Logi Vision, to be deployed as a stand-alone application or integrated with its business information platform, Logi Info. Together, these integrated products can be used by customers to address a wide range of analytics use cases across the organisation.

In July 2015, Logi DataHub was introduced as part of the Logi 12 release, designed to simplify data preparation and ensure high performance for self-service analytics. With DataHub, customers can rapidly connect, acquire, and blend data from files, applications or databases, whether on-premise or in the cloud; cache it in a high-performance self-tuning repository; and prepare it using DataHub's smart profiling, joining, and intuitive data enrichment.

In October 2017, Logi Analytics was acquired by Marlin Equity Partners, a global investment firm.

In September 2018 the company announced the release of Logi Predict™, its predictive analytics solution. The tool allows companies to embed machine learning and artificial intelligence capabilities into their own applications.

In December 2018, Logi Analytics and Jinfonet Software, the maker of JReport, tied for the number one rating for embedded analytics by Dresner Advisory Services. It was Logi’s fourth-straight year achieving the rating. In February 2019, Logi acquired Jinfonet. The acquisition added Jinfonet’s operational reporting capabilities to Logi, and allowed Logi to expand its reseller partnerships in Europe and Asia.

In June 2019, Logi Analytics acquired Zoomdata, an analytics platform for big data and live streaming data. The acquisition gives the company's clients access to Zoomdata’s streaming technology, which allows real-time visibility into data that is too big to move and data that changes frequently.

In April 2021, Logi Analytics was acquired by insightsoftware, a global enterprise software provider.

== Products ==
Logi Analytics currently offers the following analytics products:

- Logi Symphony – The current flagship platform, launched in 2023 by insightsoftware. It combines capabilities from earlier Logi products with Dundas BI from Dundas Data Visualization technology to deliver embedded business intelligence, interactive dashboards, reporting, and AI-powered analytics.
- Logi Composer - An embedded analytics development platform that allows software teams to design, build, embed, and maintain interactive dashboards and data visualizations within existing applications or portals.
- Logi Info - Logi Info is a business analytics platform that enables technology professionals to rapidly create web-based BI and analytic applications. These applications offer self-service analytical capabilities and conditional task processing that can be accessed from anywhere and on any device. The Logi Analytics Platform can also embed analytics directly into a company's operational business applications.
- Logi Report - An analytics platform that embeds operational reports and dashboards into applications.

== Market ==
Logi Analytics serves both independent software vendors (ISVs) and internal development teams seeking to embed analytics and reporting within their applications. Its platforms are used to integrate dashboards, visualizations, and self-service reporting into commercial products and enterprise systems.

In addition to traditional business intelligence (BI), Logi Symphony introduces support for AI-assisted analytics and offers greater flexibility for teams that need to customize or extend their data experience. This approach supports use cases ranging from operational reporting to interactive exploration within industry-specific applications.
