= GoodData.AI =

US-based BI & analytics company

- Type: Private startup
- Industry: Computer software
- Founded: 2007
- Founder: Roman Staněk
- Headquarters: San Francisco, U.S.
- Number of employees: 280 (March 2024)
- Website: www.gooddata.ai

GoodData.AI is a software company headquartered in San Francisco, California, in the U.S., with additional offices in Europe and Asia.

== History ==
GoodData was founded in 2007 by Czech entrepreneur Roman Staněk. Stanek had previously founded and served as CEO at NetBeans, which was acquired by Sun Microsystems in 1999, as well as Systinet Corporation, which was acquired by Hewlett Packard in 2006.

The company was founded in April 2007 as "Good Data Corporation" in Cambridge, Massachusetts. It received investment in July 2008 from Tim O'Reilly, Esther Dyson, and private equity firm Windcrest Partners for a total sum of $2 million.

In 2009, the company received funding from Andreessen Horowitz, O'Reilly AlphaTech Ventures, General Catalyst Partners, and Windcrest Partners across two rounds totaling $5 million. Funding continued with in 2010, 2011, 2012, and in late 2012, bringing its capital raised to $53.5 million. The company announced $22 million in funding led by TOTVS Ventures in 2013.

In 2019, GoodData announced a partnership with Amazon, and the integration with Amazon Redshift data warehouse solution.

On May 20, 2020, GoodData and Visa Inc. announced an investment and strategic partnership.

In June 2021, GoodData launched a new integration in partnership with Snowflake Inc.
