= Hyperion Solutions =

American software company

Hyperion Solutions Corporation

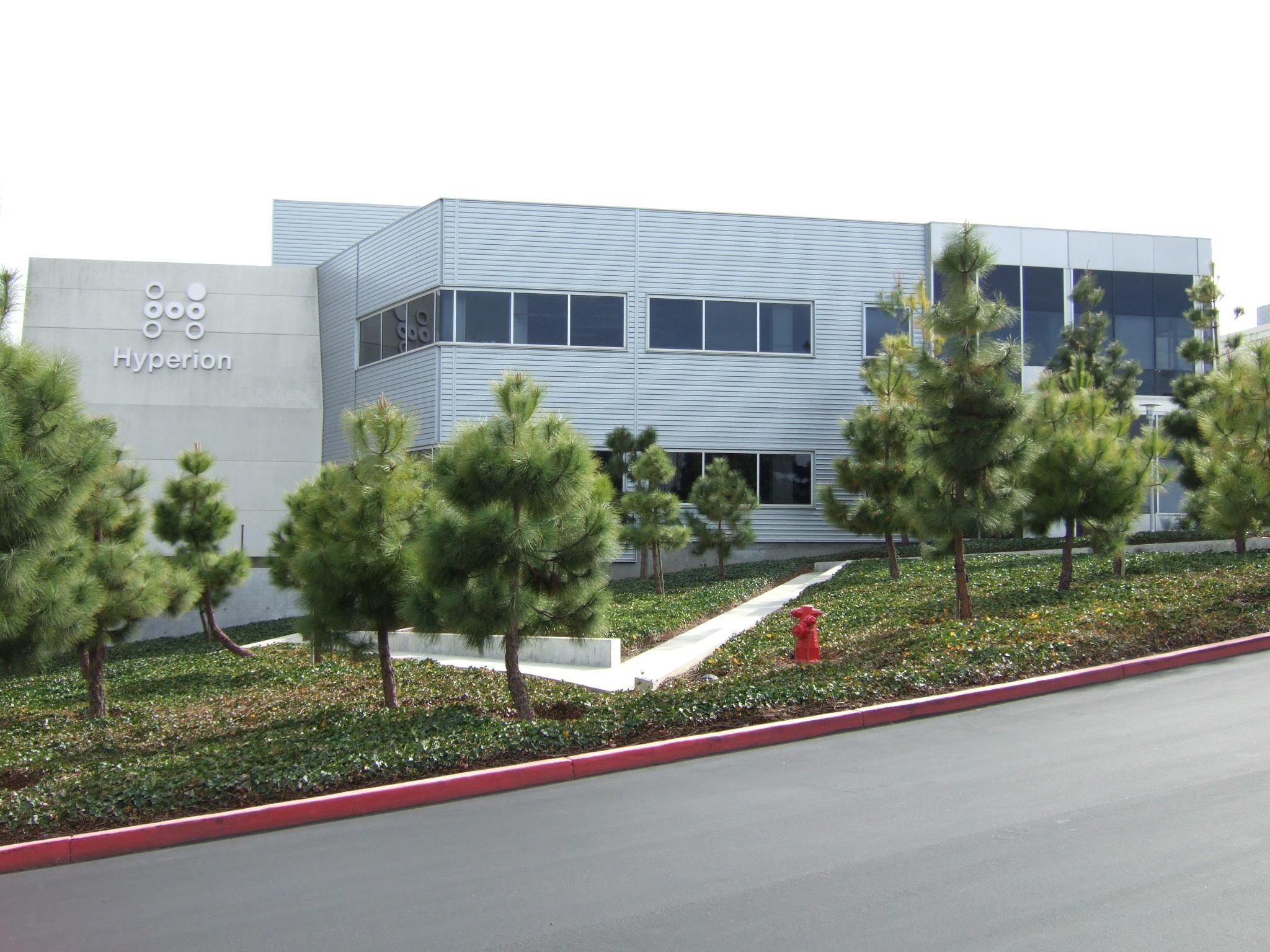
- Headquarters in Santa Clara, California
- Traded as: (Nasdaq: HYSL)
- Industry: Software
- Founded: 1981
- Defunct: 2006
- Fate: Acquired by Oracle Corporation
- Headquarters: Santa Clara, California, United States
- Key people: Godfrey R. Sullivan (President and CEO)
- Products: Business intelligence tools Business performance management tools

Hyperion Solutions Corporation was a software company located in Santa Clara, California, which was acquired by Oracle Corporation in 2007. Many of its products were targeted at the business intelligence (BI) and business performance management markets, and as of 2013 were developed and sold as Oracle Hyperion products. Hyperion Solutions was formed from the merger of Hyperion Software (formerly IMRS) and Arbor Software in 1998.

== History ==
- 1981 - IMRS founded by Bob Thomson and Marco Arese
- 1983 - IMRS launches financial and management consolidation software called "Micro Control"
- 1985 - IMRS hires Jim Perakis as CEO; he remains in this position during growth from $1M to almost $300M
- 1991 - IMRS becomes a public company and launches a Windows-based successor to 'Micro Control' called 'Hyperion'
- 1992 - Arbor Software ships first version of Essbase Online Analytical processing OLAP software
- 1995 - Due to the success of the "Hyperion" product IMRS changes name to "Hyperion Software Corporation" and the name of the product is changed to "Hyperion Enterprise." Arbor becomes a publicly held company
- 1997 - Arbor acquires Appsource
- 1998 - Hyperion Software merges with Arbor and the combined company is renamed Hyperion Solutions
- 1999 - Jeffrey Rodek named as Hyperion Chairman and CEO of Hyperion. Hyperion acquires Sapling Corporation (Enterprise Performance Management applications)
- 2001 - Godfrey Sullivan is named Hyperion President and COO
- 2003 - Hyperion acquires Brio Technology and The Alcar Group
- 2004 - Hyperion names Jeffrey Rodek Executive Chairman; Godfrey Sullivan President and CEO
- 2005 - Hyperion acquires Razza Solutions (Master data management) and appoints Northdoor as a reseller in the UK and Ireland.
- 2006 - Hyperion acquires UpStream (Financial Data Quality Management)
- 2006 - Hyperion acquires Beatware (Data visualization for Web and Mobile Devices)
- 2007 - Hyperion acquired Decisioneering (Crystal Ball software).

Oracle Corporation announced on March 1, 2007 it had agreed to purchase Hyperion Solutions Corporation for $3.3 billion in cash. The transaction was completed on April 18, 2007 and Hyperion now operates as a division of Oracle. Oracle extended support for most Hyperion products to at least 2036. Hyperion BI tools were bundled into Oracle Business Intelligence Suite Enterprise Edition.

== Market ==
Vendors in the business intelligence space are often categorized into:

- The consolidated big four "megavendors", which include Oracle Hyperion as well as SAP BusinessObjects, IBM Cognos, and Microsoft BI.
- The independent "pure-play" vendors, the largest being MicroStrategy, Tableau, QlikView and SAS.

== Products ==
Hyperion software products included:

- Essbase
- Hyperion Intelligence and SQR Production Reporting (products acquired in 2003 takeover of Brio Technology)
- Hyperion Enterprise
- Hyperion Planning
- Hyperion Strategic Finance
- Hyperion Financial Data Management
- Hyperion Enterprise Performance Management Architect
- Hyperion Financial Close Management
- Hyperion Account Reconciliation
- Hyperion Disclosure Management
- Hyperion Performance Scorecard
- Hyperion Business Modelling
- Hyperion Financial Management
- Hyperion Master Data Management/Oracle Data Relationship Management
- Hyperion Financial Reporting
- Hyperion Web Analysis
- Hyperion SmartView
- Hyperion EPM Workspace
- Hyperion Profitability and Cost Management
- Hyperion System 9 BI+ (a combination of Interactive Reporting, SQR, Web Analysis, Financial Reporting, EPM Workspace and SmartView)
- Hyperion Financial Data Quality Management (also referred to as FDMEE, for Enterprise Edition)
- Hyperion Tax Provision
- Planning Budgeting Cloud Service
- Enterprise Performance Reporting Cloud Service
