= List of big data companies =

This is an alphabetical list of notable IT companies using the marketing term big data:

== A ==
- Alpine Data Labs, analytics interface working with Apache Hadoop and big data
- Azure Data Lake, highly scalable data storage and analytics service hosted in Azure, Microsoft's public cloud

== B ==
- Big Data Scoring, cloud-based service that lets consumer lenders improve loan quality and acceptance rates
- BigPanda, technology company headquartered in Mountain View, California
- Bright Computing, developer of software for deploying and managing high-performance (HPC) clusters, big data clusters, and OpenStack in data centers and the cloud

== C ==
- Clarivate Analytics, global company that owns and operates a collection of subscription-based services focused largely on analytics
- Cloudera, American-based software company that provides Apache Hadoop-based software, support and services, and training to business customers
- Compuverde, IT company focusing on big data storage
- CVidya, provider of big data analytics products for communications and digital service providers

== D ==
- Databricks, company founded by the creators of Apache Spark
- Dataiku
- DataStax
- Domo, Inc.

== F ==
- Fluentd

== G ==
- Greenplum
- Groundhog Technologies

== H ==
- hack/reduce
- Hazelcast
- Hortonworks
- HPCC Systems

== I ==
- IBM
- InData Labs
- Imply Data

== M ==
- MapR
- MarkLogic
- Medio
- Medopad

== N ==
- NetApp

== O ==
- Oracle Cloud

== P ==
- Palantir
- Pentaho, data integration and business analytics company with an enterprise-class, open source-based platform for big data deployments
- Pitney Bowes
- Platfora

== Q ==
- Qumulo

== R ==
- Rocket Fuel Inc.

== S ==
- SAP, German multinational enterprise-software company that offers a data hub to connect data bases and other products through acquisition of Altiscale
- SalesforceIQ
- ScyllaDB, developer of a database for big data
- Sense Networks
- Shanghai Data Exchange
- SK Telecom, developer of big data analytics platform Metatron Discovery
- Sojern
- Splunk
- Sumo Logic

== T ==
- Teradata
- ThetaRay
- TubeMogul

== V ==
- VoloMetrix

== Z ==
- Zaloni, deployment- and vendor-agnostic data lake management platform
- Zoomdata
