= Ulf-Dietrich Reips =

German psychologist

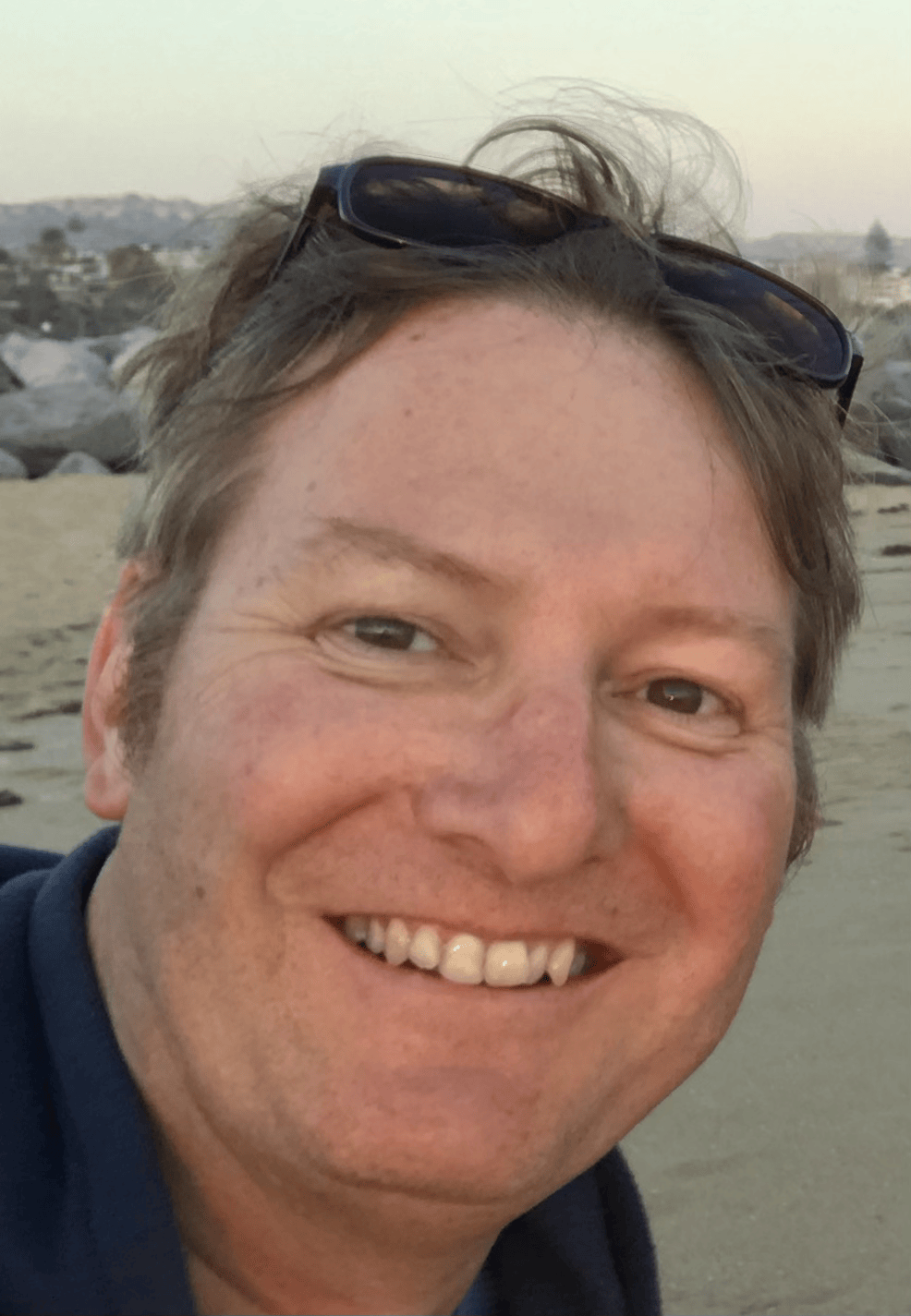

Academic background
- Education: Sonoma State University (MA, 1992); University of Tübingen (PhD, 1997)
- Website: https://www.uni-konstanz.de/iscience/reips/

Ulf-Dietrich Reips is a German psychologist and professor at the University of Konstanz, where he holds the Chair for Psychological Methods, Assessment, and Science in the Faculty of Science. From 2009 to 2013, he served as an Ikerbasque research professor at the University of Deusto in Bilbao, Spain, and he continues to be affiliated with Ikerbasque. Prior to that, he worked as a senior assistant in the Department of Psychology at the University of Zurich.

Reips's research focuses on internet-based research methodologies (including iScience, internet science, and online research methods), particularly internet-based psychological experiments (a method used in experimental psychology) and internet-based tests. His work also includes the psychology of the internet, measurement, the cognition of causality, social media, and big data.

== Education ==
Reips received a bachelor's degree from University of Tübingen, where he majored in psychology and general rhetoric and minored in political science. In 1992, he received a Master of Arts degree in psychology from Sonoma State University in California, after which he returned to the University of Tübingen, receiving a Doctor of Philosophy in 1997 and habilitation in 2004.

== Career ==
In 1994–1995, he founded the Web Experimental Psychology Lab, which was described as the first laboratory for conducting real experiments on the World Wide Web. In 1997, he was one of the seven founders of the German Society for Online Research (DGOF). His book chapter on Internet-based experimentation methodology received a Young Scientist award from the German Society for Psychology.

His 2002 article in Experimental Psychology, Standards for Internet-based experimentation, is cited in the field and became the journal's most cited article. In 2005, Reips was elected the first non-North American president of the Society for Computers in Psychology.

In 2012, Reips received a FIRST award from the University of Colorado Boulder and has since held an honorary affiliation with its Department of Psychology and Neuroscience.

Based on the impact of his publications and affiliation with Ikerbasque, the Consejo Superior de Investigaciones Cientificas in Spain ranked him seventh on a list of "Top Scientists working at Spanish Private Universities" in 2014. In the fall of 2015, Reips was offered the directorship of the Leibniz Institute for Psychology Information in Trier.

Reips is the founding editor of the International Journal of Internet Science.

== Awards ==
Reips has received awards, including the Young Scientist Award from the Methods Division of the German Psychological Society in 1997. Oxford University cited him as a "key player in the social shaping of e-science and e-social science" In January 2017, the Society for Computers in Psychology named his 2001 paper, "The Web Experimental Psychology Lab: Five years of data collection on the Internet", one of eight "groundbreaking and influential" articles in the history of the society and the field.

In 1996, Reips won the First Internet Literature competition in Germany, co-organized by the German weekly Die Zeit and IBM, with his digital poem "Das Websonett." This work is a digital media variation and sonetto di risposta based on A.W. Schlegel's original sonnet. Literature theorist Erika Greber described "Das Websonett" as "literarisch anspruchsvoll" (literarily sophisticated) and featured it in her compendium on poetological metaphorism and literature theory.

== Publications ==
- Dimensions of Internet Science (2001)
- Standards for Internet-based experimenting (2002)
- Oxford Handbook of Internet Psychology (2007)
- How Internet-mediated research changes science. (2008)
- Advice in surveying the general public over the Internet (2010, with Don A. Dillman and Uwe Matzat)
- Complete list of publications

== Web applications ==
Ulf-Dietrich Reips and his team develop and provide free Web tools for researchers and students.

- Social Lab, an open source social network
- WEXTOR, the Web experiment generator
- iScience Maps, a tool to data mine X (previously Twitter)
- VAS Generator, creates visual analogue scales as a response format in questionnaires
- Web Experiment List, a list for researchers to post their Internet-based experiments and recruit participants
- Big Five, a personality test validated for use on the Internet
- Questionnaire Checker, a tool to get feedback on questionnaires one creates
