= Prediction models =

Prediction models may refer to:

- Financial forecast or stock market prediction in finance
- Free-space path loss in telecommunications
- Predictive inference in statistics
