= Qualis =

QUALIS may refer to:

- Qualis (CAPES), a Brazilian system for qualifying academic journals
- Toyota Qualis, a Toyota car
- Toyota Mark II Qualis, a mid-size car sold by Toyota
- Talis Qualis, pen name of Swedish author C. V. A. Strandberg (181–1877)

== See also ==
- QualiSystems, a Cloud management software company
- Qualys, a cloud security provider
- Qualia
