= Web Experimental Psychology Lab =

World Wide Web-based psychology research platform

The Web Experimental Psychology Lab is a website for participating in Web-based experiments, a method used in experimental psychology. The Web Experimental Psychology Lab was founded in 1994-1995, by Ulf-Dietrich Reips at the University of Tübingen, then moved to the University of Zürich and on to the Universidad de Deusto, and is now at the University of Konstanz. For the first time, participants were able to take part in studies via a web browser in a virtual psychology laboratory.

In January 2017, the Society for Computation in Psychology named Reips' 2001 article on the Web Experimental Psychology Lab in the journal Behavior Research Methods one of eight "groundbreaking and influential" articles in the history of the society and the field.
