= Greenfield Partners =

Growth equity firm

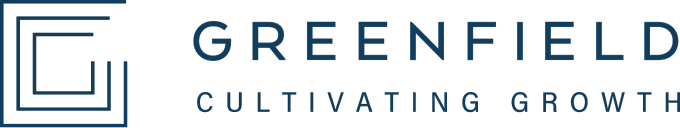
- Company type: Privately held company
- Industry: Private Equity
- Founded: 2016; 10 years ago
- Founder: TPG Growth
- Headquarters: Tel Aviv, Israel
- Website: greenfield-growth.com

Greenfield Partners is a growth equity firm based in New York and Tel Aviv that invests in early growth stage technology and tech-enabled companies.

== History ==
Established in 2016 by TPG Growth as an investment platform for early growth technology investments in Israel, Greenfield Partners is independent since 2020 and has made investments in many startups such as Vast Data, BigPanda, Guardicore, Coralogix, Silverfort and Capitolis.

== Notable exits ==
In July 2021, Check Point made its largest acquisition in over a decade by purchasing Avanan, a company from Greenfield's portfolio, for $300m. The following month, Guardicore, another firm under Greenfield's wing, was acquired by the American multinational Akamai for $600m.

== Active investments ==
Companies backed by the firm include:

- Vast Data,
- BigPanda,
- Coralogix,
- Capitolis,
- Silverfort,
- Cynet,
- DustPhotonics,
- EquityBee,
- Mixtiles,
- Planck,
- Quali,
- floLIVE,
- Torq,
- Exodigo.

== Partners ==
The partners of the firm are:

- Yuda Doron
- Shay Grinfeld,
- Avery Schwartz,
- Raz Mangel
- Nir Goldstein
