= Zaloni =

American data management software company

- Type: Private
- Founded: 2007
- Founder: Ben Sharma and Bijoy Bora
- Headquarters: Durham, North Carolina
- Products: Data analytics software

Zaloni is a privately owned, software, and services company headquartered in Durham, North Carolina, United States with offices in Guwahati, Assam,

India and Bangalore, Karnataka, India. They provide DataOps software for big data scale-out architectures, such as Amazon AWS, Microsoft Azure, and Google Cloud. They also offer additional add-ons for master data management and professional services.

== History ==
The company was founded in 2007 by Ben Sharma and Bijoy Bora as a data management company. After 5 years of working within the industry, Zaloni released its first software product, the Bedrock Data Lake Management platform. In October 2015, the company released Mica, their first self-service data preparation platform. Mica was listed in the Gartner Market Guide for Self-Service Data Preparation (August 25, 2016), showing very robust capabilities among products from over 36 products in self-service data preparation. As of March 2020, the Zaloni Data Platform, which had been created from the merging of Mica and Bedrock, has been renamed the Arena software platform.

In August 2022, Truist Financial bought the Arena platform and other assets. Sharma and most other senior management would become part of the Truist Enterprise Data Office. Zaloni would continue to operate from Raleigh, North Carolina, with 20 employees in that location.

In a deal with Infosys on September 1, 2023, Zaloni's Guwahati-based manpower was absorbed by Infosys, while its U.S.-based employees continued with Truist Financial. Following this transition, Zaloni ceased to exist as an independent entity. Subsequently, Infosys established a 230-member dedicated Project Development Centre in Guwahati.

== Technology ==
The Arena software platform is created in such a way that it is storage agnostic. Whether the data is stored on-premises, cloud, multicloud, or hybrid, it can be ingested into the platform to be accessed by governed data users throughout the organization.

Zaloni's Arena platform is based on a cloud data architecture written by Ben Sharma, called EndZone Governance. This architecture involves four zones that data travels through from ingestion to consumption. These zones are Transient Landing, Raw, Trusted, and Refined. The platform includes a metadata catalog, workflows for data quality, data preparation, and data collaboration, along with self-service data consumption that delivers data to sandboxes for business tools and applications.

== Funding ==
On March 7, 2016, Zaloni announced its Series A financing by Sierra Ventures & Baird Capital. As part of the transaction, Mark Fernandes, managing director of Sierra Ventures, joined Zaloni's board of directors. In 2018, Zaloni received a $1.5 million debt offering and in 2020 received a $6 million credit facility from Epresso Capital. As of 2021, the company had raised $7.5 million.

== Partnerships ==
On September 8, 2016, NetApp announced a partnership with Zaloni on a mid-tier storage for complete lifecycle management of the data lake.

Zaloni is also an Amazon Web Services and Microsoft Azure approved partner.
