= Big Data Scoring =

Cloud-based service

Big Data Scoring is a cloud-based service that lets consumer lenders improve loan quality and acceptance rates through the use of big data. The company was founded in 2013 and has offices in UK, Finland, Chile, Indonesia and Poland. The company's services are aimed at all lenders – banks, payday lenders, peer-to-peer lending platforms, microfinance providers and leasing companies.

== Big data based credit scoring models ==
=== Based on Facebook information ===
On April 9, 2013, the company announced that they have built a credit scoring model based purely on information from Facebook. According to the company, the scoring model has a Gini coefficient of 0.340. In order to build the model, Facebook data about individuals was collected in various European countries with prior permission from the individuals. This data was then combined with the actual loan payment information for the same people and the scoring models were built using the same tools used in building traditional credit scoring models.

=== Based on publicly available sources ===
Big Data Scoring collects vast amounts of data from publicly available online sources and uses it to predict individuals’ behavior by applying proprietary data processing and scoring algorithms. Based on client feedback, their solution delivers an improvement of up to 25% in scoring accuracy when combined with traditional in-house methods. This also robustly translates to an equivalent increase in the bottom line. In markets where traditional credit bureau data is lacking, the added benefit can be even greater to people with little or even no credit history, for example:

- young people
- unbanked and underbanked
- recent immigrants

This results in more people receiving access to credit with a better interest rate thanks to increase of scoring model accuracy.

== Predictive powers of big data in credit scoring ==
=== Facebook information ===
The company is not the first to show the predictive powers of Facebook data. Michal Kosinski, David Stillwell, and Thore Graepel from University of Cambridge have shown that "easily accessible digital records of behavior, Facebook Likes, can be used to automatically and accurately predict a range of highly sensitive personal attributes including: sexual orientation, ethnicity, religious and political views, personality traits, intelligence, happiness, use of addictive substances, parental separation, age, and gender.

=== Public sources ===
Filene Research Institute published a paper showing clear patterns in transactional data, credit score and external factors like the recent price of S&P 500.

== Press coverage and acknowledgements ==
In October 2013, Big Data Scoring was selected as one finalist of the Websummit exhibition start-up ALPHA program. In March 2013, Big Data Scoring was selected as one finalists of the Code_n competition, which is part of the CeBIT exhibition in Hannover, Germany. During Finovate Fall 2015 conference the CEO of Big Data Scoring presented their solutions live on stage. The company has been featured in many on-line magazines, including MarketWatch, PCWorld and eWeek.

Big Data Scoring is working together with MasterCard in their Start Path program.

== Criticism ==
Estonian business daily Äripäev raised the question whether data mining used for credit scoring is done legally. According to the company, their solution requires a permission from the users of Facebook to access their data and nothing is collected without the prior permission. Other sources such as MSN News have cited invasion of privacy as an additional concern regarding using social media information in credit scoring.
