= Martin Hilbert =

American social scientist and academic (born 1977)

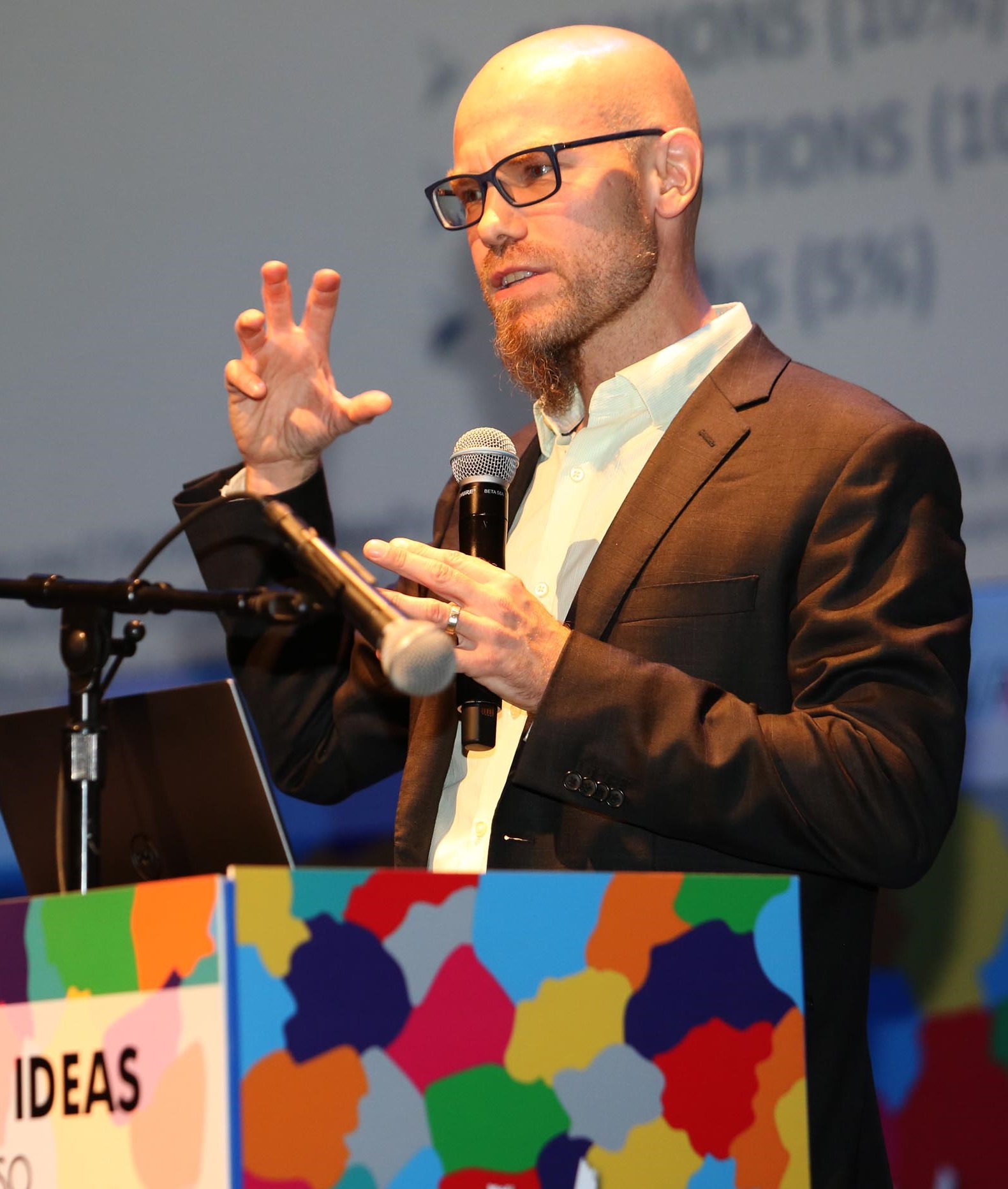
- Hilbert presenting at Puerto de Ideas
- Born: 1977 (age 48–49)
- Education: USC Annenberg School (PhD); University of Erlangen–Nuremberg (Dr. rer.pol.)
- Known for: Big Data; Information explosion eLAC Action Plans.
- Scientific career
- Fields: Computational Social Science, Information Theory, Complex Systems, Information Society
- Workplaces: University of California, Davis
- Doctoral advisors: Manuel Castells (2012); Karl Albrecht Schachtschneider (2006)

Martin Hilbert (born 1977) is an American social scientist and a professor at the University of California, where he chairs the campus-wide emphasis on Computational Social Science. His research examines the role of digital technologies, information systems, and data in society.

Hilbert academic work includes studies on the measurement and analysis of global information, including estimates of the world’s information capacity. He has also contributed to policy-related initiatives on digital development, including regional agendas in Latin America and the Caribbean through United Nations–supported eLAC Action Plans. His research and public commentary have addressed data analytics, communication technologies, and their societal implications, including early discussions of data-driven political campaigning and the role of Cambridge Analytica prior to the wider public controversy.

== Career and research ==
Hilbert served as an Economic Affairs Officer at the United Nations Economic Commission for Latin America and the Caribbean (ECLAC) for approximately 15 years, where he worked on initiatives related to the development of the information society in the region, including contributions to the eLAC Action Plans. These plans outline regional digital development agendas for Latin America and the Caribbean.

His research focuses on the processes and impacts of digitalization and the use of data and algorithms in society. His work has been published across multiple academic disciplines, including communication studies, information science, international development, evolution and ecology, technological forecasting, complexity science, network science, economics, physics, psychology, women's studies and multidisciplinary science.

In addition to his academic work, Hilbert has delivered keynote talks on topics related to digital technologies and society.

=== Consulting ===
Hilbert has provided advisory support on digital development to governments and organizations, particularly in Latin America. His work has included collaboration with public and private sector entities on topics related to data and digital transformation.

=== Teaching ===
Hilbert has developed and taught university-level courses, some of which are available as MOOCs on platforms such as Coursera. These courses cover topics including digital technology and social change, computational social science methods, artificial intelligence, and social network analysis, and have attracted large enrollments globally. His methods course, University of California Computational Social Science, introduces the scientific method using computational tools and concepts from complexity science, and was developed as a UC-wide online course with contributions from faculty across all 10 campuses.

=== Awards & Recognitions ===
Hilbert has received recognition for work in areas including visual communication and published interviews. He has held a distinguished scholar position at the Library of Congress and has been associated with online teaching initiatives and course rankings. He has also received awards for online teaching from the University of California Office of the President’s Innovative Learning Technology Initiative (ILTI). He has been selected to serve on the Scholars Council of the U.S. Library of Congress for the 2026–2031 term.
