= Craig A. Hill =

American statistician

Craig A. Hill was a research institute executive and a Fellow of the American Statistical Association. His research focuses on big data and the application of new technologies to social science methods.

== Education and career ==
He received his Ph.D. and M.A. in political science from the University of New Orleans and has published and presented more than 50 papers, ranging from hospital ranking methodology, survey interviewer fraud, and new technology and data sources for social science research. He has published two books: Social Media, Sociality, and Survey Research and Big Data Meets Survey Science: A Collection of Innovative Methods.

Until July 2024, he was Senior Vice President at RTI International for more than 20 years. Prior to RTI, he was a vice president at NORC at the University of Chicago.

== Recognition ==
In 2019, he was elected as a Fellow of the American Statistical Association. In 2021, he received the Warren J. Mitofsky Innovators Award from the American Association for Public Opinion Research for founding the Big Data Meets Survey Science (BigSurv) initiative.
