= Shanghai Data Exchange =

- 上海数据交易中心
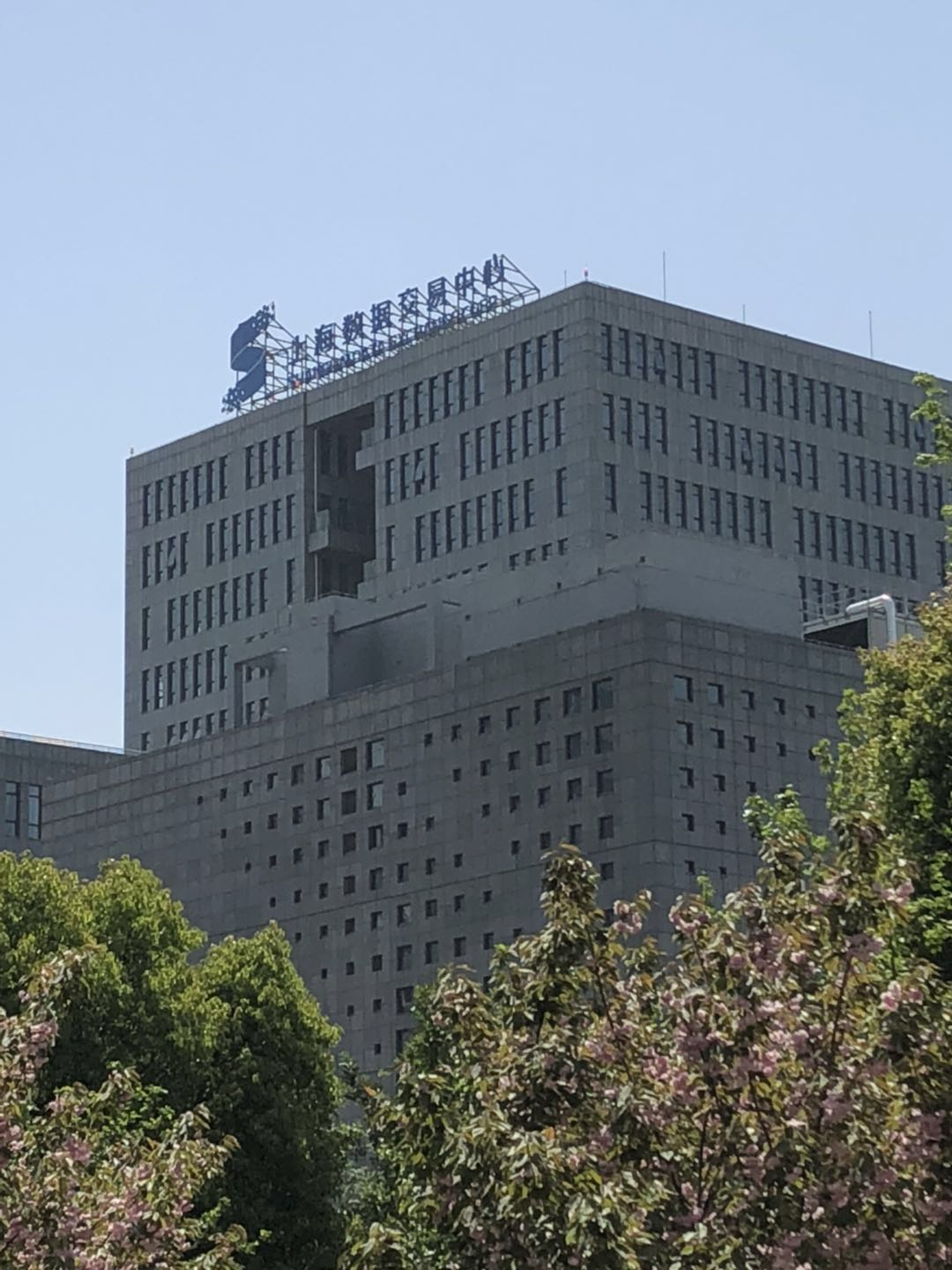
- Type: Data exchange
- Location: Shanghai, China
- Founded: 1 April 2016
- Key people: Keven Tang Qifeng (CEO)
- Currency: RMB
- Website: www.chinadep.com

Shanghai Data Exchange
- Traditional Chinese: 上海數據交易中心
- Simplified Chinese: 上海数据交易中心
Transcriptions

The Shanghai Data Exchange (SDE; Chinese: 上海数据交易中心; pinyin: shànghǎi shùjù jiāoyì zhōngxīn) is a data exchange centre based in the city of Shanghai, China. It is situated in the Jing'an district of Shanghai.

== History ==
=== 2016 ===
Shanghai Data Exchange is approved by the Shanghai Municipal People's Government of Shanghai, Shanghai Municipal economic and information Commission, Shanghai Municipal Commission of Commerce official reply jointly to set up state-controlled mixed-ownership enterprises. By the Shanghai information investment company, China Telecom, China Unicom, China electronic information industrial group, Shen Neng (Group) company limited, Shanghai yidian holding (Group) company, Shanghai Jing praised technology development co, Shanghai information technology company limited, Wanda information company limited, Shanghai Alliance investment management company jointly founded with registered capital of 200 million Yuan.

=== 2017 ===
Shanghai Data Exchange together with China Internet Network Information Center, China Unicom, Fudan University and China Academy of Information and Communications Technology constructed China's first national engineering laboratory for big data distribution and exchange technologies. This lab aims to enhance China's ability in supporting fundamental sectors of big data. In September, Shanghai Data Exchange released a credit risk profile product that offers a database of 50 million enterprises. The product is designed for financial institutions such as banks, brokerages, insurers and P2P platforms to improve risk control through credit and data checking.

=== Chronology ===
- April 2016 - The first share list appeared in June.
- March 2017 - Award the China's first national engineering laboratory for big data distribution and exchange technologies.
- September 2017 - Developed a financial product named credit risk profile .
