= Big data maturity model =

Aspect of computer science

Big data maturity models (BDMM) are the artifacts used to measure big data maturity. These models help organizations to create structure around their big data capabilities and to identify where to start. They provide tools that assist organizations to define goals around their big data program and to communicate their big data vision to the entire organization. BDMMs also provide a methodology to measure and monitor the state of a company's big data capability, the effort required to complete their current stage or phase of maturity and to progress to the next stage. Additionally, BDMMs measure and manage the speed of both the progress and adoption of big data programs in the organization.

The goals of BDMMs are:

- To provide a capability assessment tool that generates specific focus on big data in key organizational areas
- To help guide development milestones
- To avoid pitfalls in establishing and building big data capabilities
- To encourage a data-driven culture that goes beyond tools and technology.
- To guide smarter investments by showing where resources will have the most impact.

Key organizational areas refer to "people, process and technology" and the subcomponents include alignment, architecture, data, data governance, delivery, development, measurement, program governance, scope, skills, sponsorship, statistical modelling, technology, value and visualization.

The stages or phases in BDMMs depict the various ways in which data can be used in an organization and is one of the key tools to set direction and monitor the health of an organization's big data programs.

An underlying assumption is that a high level of big data maturity correlates with an increase in revenue and reduction in operational expense. However, reaching the highest level of maturity involves major investments over many years. Only a few companies are considered to be at a "mature" stage of big data and analytics. These include internet-based companies (such as LinkedIn, Facebook, and Amazon) and other non-Internet-based companies, including financial institutions (fraud analysis, real-time customer messaging and behavioral modeling) and retail organizations (click-stream analytics together with self-service analytics for teams).

== Categories ==
Big data maturity models can be broken down into three broad categories namely:

- Descriptive
- Comparative
- Prescriptive

== Descriptive ==
Descriptive models assess the current firm maturity through qualitative positioning of the firm in various stages or phases. The model does not provide any recommendations as to how a firm would improve their big data maturity.

=== Big data and analytics maturity model (IBM model) ===
This descriptive model aims to assess the value generated from big data investments towards supporting strategic business initiatives.

Maturity levels

The model consists of the following maturity levels:

- Ad-hoc
- Foundational
- Competitive differentiating
- Break away

Assessment areas

Maturity levels also cover areas in matrix format focusing on: business strategy, information, analytics, culture and execution, architecture and governance.

=== Knowledgent big data maturity assessment ===
Consisting of an assessment survey, this big data maturity model assesses an organization's readiness to execute big data initiatives. Furthermore, the model aims to identify the steps and appropriate technologies that will lead an organization towards big data maturity.

== Comparative ==
Comparative big data maturity models aim to benchmark an organization in relation to its industry peers and normally consist of a survey containing quantitative and qualitative information.

=== CSC big data maturity tool ===
The CSC big data maturity tool acts as a comparative tool to benchmark an organization's big data maturity. A survey is undertaken and the results are then compared to other organizations within a specific industry and within the wider market.

=== TDWI big data maturity model ===
The TDWI big data maturity model is a model in the current big data maturity area and therefore consists of a significant body of knowledge.

Maturity stages

The different stages of maturity in the TDWI BDMM can be summarized as follows:

Stage 1: Nascent

The nascent stage as a pre–big data environment. During this stage:

- The organization has a low awareness of big data or its value
- There is little to no executive support for the effort and only some people in the organization are interested in potential value of big data
- The organization understand the benefits of analytics and may have a data warehouse
- An organization's governance strategy is typically more IT-centric rather than being integrative business-and-IT centric

Stage 2: Pre-adoption

During the pre-adoption stage:

- The organization start to investigate big data analytics

Stage 3: Early adoption The "chasm" There is then generally a series of hurdles it needs to overcome. These hurdles include:

- Obtaining the right skill set to support the capability, including Hadoop and advanced analytical skills
- Political issues, i.e. big data projects are conducted in areas within the organization and trying to expand the effort or enforcing more stringent standards and governance lead to issues regarding ownership and control

Stage 4: Corporate adoption

The corporate adoption stage is characterized by the involvement of end-users, an organization gains further insight and the way of conducting business is transformed. During this stage:

- End-users might have started operationalizing big data analytics or changing their decision-making processes
- Most organizations would already have repeatedly addressed certain gaps in their infrastructure, data management, governance and analytics

Stage 5: Mature / visionary

Only a few organizations can be considered as visionary in terms of big data and big data analytics. During this stage an organization:

- is able to execute big data programs as a well-oiled machine with highly mature infrastructure
- has a well-established big data program and big data governance strategies
- executes its big data program as a budgeted and planned initiative from an organization-wide perspective
- whose employees share a level of excitement and energy around big data and big data analytics

Research findings

TDWI did an assessment on 600 organizations and found that the majority of organizations are either in the pre-adoption (50%) or early adoption (36%) stages. Additionally, only 8% of the sample have managed to move past the chasm towards corporate adoption or being mature/visionary.

== Prescriptive ==
The majority of prescriptive BDMMs follow a similar modus operandi in that the current situation is first assessed followed by phases plotting the path towards increased big data maturity. Examples are:

=== Info-tech big data maturity assessment tool ===
This maturity model is prescriptive in the sense that the model consists of four distinct phases that each plot a path towards big data maturity. Phases are:

- Phase 1, undergo big data education
- Phase 2, assess big data readiness
- Phase 3, pinpoint a killer big data use case
- Phase 4, structure a big data proof-of-concept project

=== Radcliffe big data maturity model ===
The Radcliffe big data maturity model, as other models, also consists of distinct maturity levels ranging from:

- 0 – "In the dark"
- 1 – "Catching up"
- 2 – "First pilot"
- 3 – "Tactical value"
- 4 – "Strategic leverage"
- 5 – "Optimize and extend"

=== Booz & Company's model ===
This BDMM provides a framework that not only enables organizations to view the extent of their current maturity, but also to identify goals and opportunities for growth in big data maturity. The model consists of four stages namely,

- Stage 1: Performance management
- Stage 2: Functional area excellence
- Stage 3: Value proposition enhancement
- Stage 4: Business model transformation

=== Van Veenstra's model ===
The prescriptive model proposed by Van Veenstra aims to firstly explore the existing big data environment of the organization followed by exploitation opportunities and a growth path towards big data maturity. The model makes use of four phases namely:

- Efficiency
- Effectiveness
- New solutions
- Transformation

== Critical evaluation ==
Current BDMMs have been evaluated under the following criteria:

- Completeness of the model structure (completeness, consistency)
- The quality of model development and evaluation (trustworthiness, stability)
- Ease of application (ease of use, comprehensibility)
- Big data value creation (actuality, relevancy, performance)

The TDWI and CSC have the strongest overall performance with steady scores in each of the criteria groups. The overall results communicate that the top performer models are extensive, balanced, well-documented, easy to use, and they address a good number of big data capabilities that are utilized in business value creation. The models of Booz & Company and Knowledgent are close seconds and these mid-performers address big data value creation in a commendable manner, but fall short when examining the completeness of the models and the ease of application. Knowledgent suffers from poor quality of development, having barely documented any of its development processes. The rest of the models, i.e. Infotech, Radcliffe, van Veenstra and IBM, have been categorized as low performers. Whilst their content is well aligned with business value creation through big data capabilities, they all lack quality of development, ease of application and extensiveness. Lowest scores were awarded to IBM and Van Veenstra, since both are providing low level guidance for the respective maturity model's practical use, and they completely lack in documentation, ultimately resulting in poor quality of development and evaluation.

== See also ==
- Capability Maturity Model
