= Imply Data =

American software company

Imply
- Industry: Computer software
- Founded: 2015
- Founders: Fangjin Yang; Gian Merlino; Vadim Ogievetsky
- Headquarters: Burlingame, California, United States
- Website: www.imply.io

Imply Data, Inc. is an American software company. It develops and provides commercial support for the open-source Apache Druid, a real-time database designed to power analytics applications.

== History ==
Druid was open-sourced in October 2012 under the GPL license. Over time, notable organizations including Netflix and Yahoo adopted the project into their technology stacks. The increased adoption led the team to change the license of the project to Apache.

In October 2015, the company raised $2 million from Khosla Ventures and launched its first product, combining Apache Druid and additional open-source components, including a user interface and the PlyQL SQL-like query language, plus enterprise support.

In December 2019 it raised an additional $30 million, suggesting a valuation of $350 million. The funding round was led by Andreessen Horowitz with participation from Khosla Ventures and Geodesic Ventures.

A Series C round of $70 million, valuing the company at $700 million, was announced in June 2021, led by Bessemer Venture Partners.

Also in November, 2021, Imply announced Project Shapeshift, designed to develop a hardware-abstracting, auto-scaling control plane and SaaS service for Apache Druid; extend the Druid SQL API from querying to ingestion, processing and transformation; and build a serverless and elastic consumption platform.
