= XLDB =

XLDB (eXtremely Large DataBases) was a yearly conference about databases, data management and analytics held from 2007 to 2019. The definition of extremely large refers to data sets that are too big in terms of volume (too much), and/or velocity (too fast), and/or variety (too many places, too many formats) to be handled using conventional solutions. This conference dealt with the high-end of very large databases (VLDB). It was conceived and chaired by Jacek Becla.

== History ==
In October 2007, data experts gathered at SLAC National Accelerator Lab for the First Workshop on Extremely Large Databases. As a result, the XLDB research community was formed to meet the rapidly growing demands of the largest data systems. In addition to the original invitational workshop, an open conference, tutorials, and annual satellite events on different continents were added. The main event, held annually at Stanford University gathers over 300 attendees. XLDB is one of the data systems events catering to both academic and industry communities. For 2009, the workshop was co-located with VLDB 2009 in France to reach out to non-US research communities. XLDB 2019 followed Stanford's Conference on Systems and Machine Learning (SysML).

== Goals ==
The main goals of this community include:

- Identify trends, commonalities and major roadblocks related to building extremely large databases
- Bridge the gap between users trying to build extremely large databases and database solution providers worldwide
- Facilitate development and growth of practical technologies for extremely large data stores

== XLDB Community ==
As of 2013, the community consisted of over one thousand members including:

1. Scientists who develop, use, or plan to develop or use XLDB for their research, from laboratories.
2. Commercial users of XLDB.
3. Providers of database products, including commercial vendors and representatives from open source database communities.
4. Academic database researchers.

== XLDB Conferences, Workshops and Tutorials ==
The community met annually at Stanford University through 2019. Occasional satellite events were held in Asia and Europe.

A detailed report or videos was produced after each workshop.

Year	Place	Link	Report	Comments
2019	Stanford			12th XLDB Conference
2018	Stanford			11th XLDB Conference
2017	Clermont-Ferrand			10th XLDB Conference
2016	Stanford			9th XLDB Conference
2015	Stanford			8th XLDB Conference
2014	Observatório Nacional, Rio de Janeiro			Satellite XLDB Workshop in South America
2014	Stony_Brook_University			XLDB-Healthcare Workshop
2013	Stanford			7th XLDB Conference
2013	CERN, Geneva/Switzerland			Satellite XLDB Workshop in Europe
2012	Stanford			6th XLDB Conference, Workshop & Tutorials
2012	Beijing, China			Satellite XLDB Conference in Asia
2011	SLAC			5th XLDB Conference and Workshop
2011	Edinburgh, UK		not available	Satellite XLDB Workshop in Europe
2010	SLAC			4th XLDB Conference and Workshop
2009	Lyon, France			3rd XLDB Workshop
2008	SLAC			2nd XLDB Workshop
2007	SLAC			1st XLDB Workshop

== Tangible results ==
XLDB events led to initiating an effort to build a new open source, science database called SciDB.

The XLDB organizers started defining a science benchmark for scientific data management systems called SS-DB.

At XLDB 2012 the XLDB organizers announced that two major databases that support arrays as first-class objects (MonetDB SciQL and SciDB) have formed a working group in conjunction with XLDB. This working group is proposing a common syntax (provisionally named “ArrayQL”) for manipulating arrays, including array creation and query.
