= Society for Computation in Psychology =

Scholarly organization

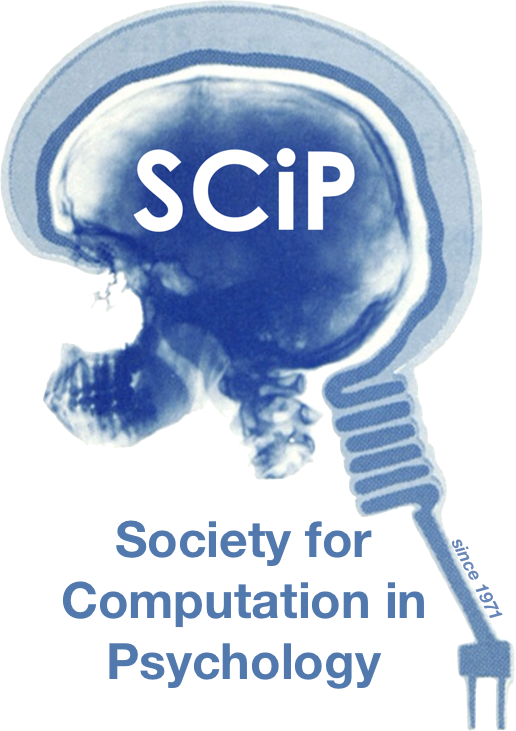
- Founded: 1971
- Purpose: Psychology, Cognitive Science
- Key people: Alexandra Paxton, President; Rick Dale, Executive Director; Erin M. Buchanan, Executive Director
- Website: www.computationinpsych.com
- Formerly called: Society for Computers in Psychology

The Society for Computation in Psychology (SCiP, formerly Society for Computers in Psychology) is a scholarly society founded in 1971 with the purpose of the increasing and diffusing knowledge of the use of computers in psychological research.

SCiP is an organization of researchers interested in applications of computational techniques and methods in psychology. One focus over the past several years has been on aiding psychologists in using computers in their teaching and research, statistical analysis tools, web-based research, clinical applications, and computational modelling. The Society has also encouraged consideration of psychological aspects of hardware and software development and design.

== History ==
SCiP was initiated in 1971 by Donald Tepas who, with support from the National Science Foundation, organized the first National Conference on the Use of On-Line Computers in Psychology (NCUOLCP). The conference took place the day before the annual meeting of the Psychonomic Society, and proceedings were published in the journal Behavior Research Methods & Instrumentation (BRMI) (now Behavior Research Methods), providing the template for future gatherings.

In its first decades, the society tracked and contributed to the rise of computers in psychological research and society more generally, adopting the name Society for Computers in Psychology in 1982. Its members were also quick to pick up on the potential of the World Wide Web as a medium for and topic of research.

More recently, reflecting the ever-increasing influence of computation and computational methods in psychology, the society has accommodated technical contributions as well as substantive research that makes use of these developments. In 2019, members voted to change its name once more, to Society for Computation in Psychology.

== Annual meeting ==
The Society holds an annual meeting with talks and posters attended by psychologists from around the world. The meeting precedes the Annual meeting of the Psychonomic Society.

== Castellan Award ==
The John Castellan Student Paper Award is awarded annually to a student or recent graduate based on work done as a student.

== Early Career Impact Award ==
The Federation of Associations in Behavioral & Brain Sciences (FABBS), which provides support for the Early Career Impact Award for the Society for Computers in Psychology, is a FABBS society.
