= BigPanda =

Software company headquartered in Redwood City, California

- Company type: Private
- Industry: Software
- Founded: 2012
- Founder: Assaf Resnick; Elik Eizenberg
- Headquarters: Redwood City, California
- Website: bigpanda.io

BigPanda is a private software company headquartered in Redwood City, California. BigPanda Incident Intelligence and Automation, powered by AIOps, supports companies to prevent service outages and improve incident management.

BigPanda was founded in 2012 with $1.5 million in initial funding. Two years later, the company came out of stealth mode, took its software-as-a-service product out of beta, and announced $7 million in Series A funding. This was followed by a Series B funding round in 2015 that was originally for $16 million then grew by $23 million more. A Series C funding round in late 2019 raised another $50 million for international expansion and product development. BigPanda became valued at $1.2 billion following a new Series D & E round bringing its total capital to $340 million.
