= Tobias Preis =

German scientist

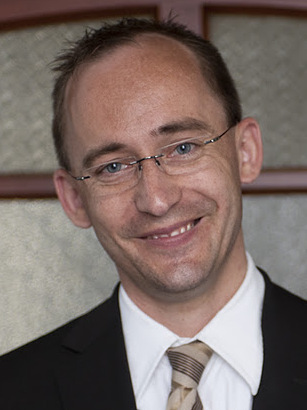
- Born: 1981 (age 44–45)
- Education: Johannes Gutenberg University of Mainz
- Known for: Identification of links between online behavior and real world economic events
- Scientific career
- Fields: Data science; Data mining; Forecasting; Complex Systems; Computational Social Science
- Workplaces: Warwick Business School; Alan Turing Institute; Boston University; University College London; Swiss Federal Institute of Technology Zurich; Massachusetts Institute of Technology; Deutsche Bank; Artemis Capital Asset Management GmbH

Tobias Preis is Professor of Behavioral Science and Finance at Warwick Business School and a fellow of the Alan Turing Institute. He is a computational social scientist focussing on measuring and predicting human behavior with online data. At Warwick Business School he directs the Data Science Lab together with his colleague Suzy Moat. Preis holds visiting positions at Boston University and University College London. In 2011, he worked as a senior research fellow with H. Eugene Stanley at Boston University and with Dirk Helbing at ETH Zurich. In 2009, he was named a member of the Gutenberg Academy. In 2007, he founded Artemis Capital Asset Management GmbH, a proprietary trading firm which is based in Germany. He was awarded a PhD in physics from the Johannes Gutenberg University of Mainz in Germany.

Preis has quantified and modelled financial market fluctuations. In addition, he has made contributions to general-purpose computing on graphics processing units (GPGPU) in statistical physics and computational finance.

== Research ==
In 2010, Preis headed a research team which provided evidence that search engine query data and stock market fluctuations are correlated. The team discovered a link between the number of Internet searches for company names and transaction volumes of the corresponding stocks on a weekly time scale. In a TEDx talk, Preis highlights the opportunities offered by studies of citizens' online behaviour to gain insights into socio and economic decision making.

In 2012, Preis used Google Trends data to demonstrate together with his colleagues Suzy Moat, H. Eugene Stanley and Steven R. Bishop that Internet users from countries with a higher per capita gross domestic product (GDP) are more likely to search for information about the future than information about the past. The findings, published in the journal Scientific Reports, suggest there may be a link between online behaviour and real-world economic indicators. Preis and colleagues examined Google search queries made by Internet users in 45 countries in 2010 and calculated the ratio of the volume of searches for the coming year (2011) to the volume of searches for the previous year (2009), which they call the Future Orientation Index. A comparison of the Future Orientation Index to the per capita GDP of each country revealed a strong tendency for countries in which Google users enquire more about the future to exhibit a higher GDP. Preis and colleagues conclude from this study that a relationship potentially exists between the economic success of a country and the information-seeking behaviour of its citizens online.

In 2013, Preis and his colleagues Moat and Stanley introduced a method to identify online precursors for stock market moves, using trading strategies based on search volume data provided by Google Trends. Their analysis of Google search volume for 98 terms of varying financial relevance, published in Scientific Reports, suggests that increases in search volume for financially relevant search terms tend to precede large losses in financial markets. Similarly, in a study also published in Scientific Reports in 2013, Moat, Preis and colleagues demonstrated a link between changes in the number of views of Wikipedia articles relating to financial topics and subsequent large stock market moves.

In 2015, Preis and his colleague Moat designed and delivered a massive open online course (MOOC) on big data. The course focuses on measuring and predicting human behavior.

Preis is an academic editor of PLoS ONE.

== See also ==
- List of Wikipedia people
