= QualiSystems =

Cloud management software company

Quali
- Company type: Private
- Industry: Software
- Founded: 2004
- Founders: Alex Ackerman and Moshe Moskovitch
- Headquarters: Austin, Texas, United States
- Key people: Lior Koriat, CEO
- Products: CloudShell
- Services: Cloud management software
- Website: www.quali.com

Quali is a private company providing enterprise sandbox software for Cloud and DevOps automation. With its SaaS-based Torque platform, Quali gives developers, QA, and IT operations self-service access to on-demand application and infrastructure environments across private, public, and hybrid-cloud deployments.

The company has offices in North America and Israel. It has additional sales and support channels in Europe and APAC. The company's clients include independent software vendors, network carriers, service providers, network equipment manufacturers, storage manufacturers, data centers and financial services companies. Lior Koriat has been CEO of Quali since 2008.

== History ==
Quali was founded in 2004 by CEO Alex Ackerman and CTO Moshe Moskovitch as Nibea Quality Management Solutions. In March 2007 it changed its name to QualiSystems, Ltd. and further re-branded as Quali in 2016
