= System Architect =

Enterprise architecture tool

UNICOM System Architect

- System Architect with Heatmap, BPMN and Network Diagrams Open and Browsed
- Developers: UNICOM Systems, a division of UNICOM Global
- Stable release: System Architect 2027 -- Version 11.4.14 / Released October 2, 2026; available on UNICOM support portal: https://support.unicomsi.com/.
- Operating system: Microsoft Windows
- Website: teamblue.unicomsi.com/products/system-architect/

Unicom System Architect is an enterprise architecture tool that is used by the business and technology departments of corporations and government agencies to model their business operations and the systems, applications, and databases that support them. System Architect is used to build architectures using various frameworks including TOGAF, ArchiMate, DoDAF, MODAF, NAF and standard method notations such as sysML, UML, BPMN, and relational data modeling. System Architect is developed by UNICOM Systems, a division of UNICOM Global, a United States–based company.

== Overview ==
Enterprise architecture (EA) is a mechanism for understanding all aspects of the organization, and planning for change. Those aspects include business transformation, business process rationalization, business or capability-driven solution development, application rationalization, transformation of IT to the cloud, server consolidation, service management and deployment, building systems of systems architectures, and so forth.

Most simply, users use EA and System Architect to build diagrammatic and textual models of any and all aspects of their organization, including the who, what, where, when, why, and how things are done so they can understand the current situation, and plan for the future. Parts of the EA can be harvested from existing sources of information in the organization—auto-discovery of network architectures, database architectures, etc. The users building the models are typically enterprise architects, business architects, business analysts, data architects, and software architects. This information can be viewed by all stakeholders of the organization — including its workers, management, and outside vendors (depending on the level of access they have been granted to the information), through generation of the information to a static website, or enabling direct web-access to the information in the repository. The stakeholders can use this information to get answers to questions about the organization's architecture in the form of visual diagrams and reports that produce textual information, pie charts, and other dashboards.

System Architect is widely used in developing defense architectures. The Architecture Development and Analysis Survey, conducted by MITRE Corporation for the US Office of the Assistant Secretary of Defense for Networks & Information Integration (OASD NII) and revealed at the CISA worldwide conference on December 1, 2005, reported that out of 96 programs building DoDAF architectures responding to the survey, 77% used System Architect, either by itself (48%) or in conjunction with another modeling tool (29%).

System Architect has been referenced in textbooks written in the field of enterprise architecture, UML, and data modeling, and was also used to build some or all of the models that appear in some of these books.

== History ==
System Architect was initially created and developed by Jan Popkin under the auspices of Popkin Software. System Architect was one of the first Windows-based computer-aided software engineering (CASE) tools. It evolved through the years to become an enterprise architecture modeling tool — one that enables the end user to utilize many notations and methods to model aspects of their organization in a repository and disseminate this information to a large audience.

Telelogic acquired Popkin Software in April, 2005 and IBM acquired Telelogic in 2008. After acquisition of Telelogic, IBM included System Architect (and all other Telelogic products) in the Rational division, named after Rational Software, which it acquired in 2003. On January 1, 2016, IBM announced that UNICOM Global had acquired System Architect from IBM, and that its core development and support team, which originated at Popkin Software, was joining UNICOM Systems to continue to build the product line.

== Features ==
System Architect includes support for:

- Enterprise Architecture Frameworks and Reference Models
  - TOGAF 10.0
  - SAFe 6.0
    - User journey Map (also called Customer Journey Map)
    - Value Stream
    - Brainstorming
    - Ideation (creative process)
    - Problem Framing
  - UAF 1.3 (the latest version of UPDM)
  - Mission Engineering -- as part of UAF 1.3
  - DoDAF 2.02
  - ArchiMate v4
  - NATO Architecture Framework (NAF) 4.0
  - MODAF 1.2
  - IAF v4 Integrated Architecture Framework
  - Federal Enterprise Architecture Framework 2.0 (FEAF 2.0) via Federal EA add-on option (formerly called iRMA)
  - Technology Business Management Council TBM
  - Zachman Framework
- sysML 1.6
- UML 2.5 (comprehensive) and UML 2.0 'Lite'
- Business Process Modeling Notation (BPMN) 2.0
  - Simulation of BPMN models through SA/simulator add-on
  - BPEL generation
- Customer experience journey maps
- Service oriented architecture
- Balanced Scorecard
- OMG Business Motivation Model (BMM) via Enterprise Direction diagram
- Cause-Effect Analysis and Gap analysis through Network-style Explorer diagram
- Landscape and Heatmap analysis Heat map through Landscape-style Explorer diagram
- Analytics
- Functional decomposition
- Organizational chart
- Network architecture modeling
- Roadmapping
- Application Portfolio Management and Service oriented architecture (SOA) development through SOA add-on
- Application Portfolio Management, IT portfolio management, and decision-based trade-off analysis via:
  - Integration with Unicom Focal Point
- Relational Data Modeling - Logical Entity-relationship model and Physical diagramming
- Reverse engineering and/or generation of database schema via integration with IBM Infosphere Data Architect
- Object-relational mapping
- Data flow diagramming
- IDEF
- Cross-Reference Matrices
- Underlying Repository in SQL Server 2012, SQL Server 2008, or SQL Server 2008 Express
- Multi-user network environment
- SQL-based query reporting language
- Role-based access control
- Native Requirements management
- Interface to DOORS for Requirements management
- Extensibility through:
  - Customizable Metamodeling
  - Visual Basic for Applications (VBA) for extending functionality
- Model-to-model transformations
- Report Generation via:
  - Native Report Generator using SQL-like language
  - Integration with IBM Rational Publishing Engine
- Business Intelligence Dashboard Analysis via:
  - Cognos-based Business Intelligence (BI) reporting bundled with product
  - Integration with IBM Rational Insight
- Governance of Files and Assets Associated with EA via:
  - Integration with IBM Rational Asset Manager (RAM)
- Web access to Enterprise Architecture repository via:
  - HTML Generator
  - Report-based website generation via SA/Publisher add-on
  - Live web read/write access to repository via SA/XT product
- Integrations:
  - IBM Cognos BI 10.2 via System Architect BI Integrator that ships with product
  - Microsoft Power BI via System Architect BI Integrator that ships with product
  - Tableau Software via System Architect BI Integrator that ships with product
  - Unicom Focal Point (bidirectional integration provided at no extra charge)
  - IBM Tivoli TADDM/CCMDB (off-the-shelf assets tailored for the customer by services engagement)
  - WebSphere Business Modeler (export of BPMN diagrams from SA to WBM via no extra charge add-in)
  - Rational DOORS (no-extra-charge integration provided with SA)
  - Rational Software Architect (RSA) (bidirectional import/export of UML diagrams; no-extra-charge integration is in RSA tool)
  - Rational Rhapsody (export of DoDAF information from SA to Rhapsody; no-extra-charge integration is in Rhapsody tool)
  - Rational Change (no-extra-charge integration provided with SA)
  - Rational Publishing Engine (RPE) for cross-IBM-Rational-product reporting
  - Lanner Group Ltd Witness (paid add-on called SA Simulator III)
  - SAP for process architecture information via IntelliCorp (Software) LiveCapture paid add-on
  - SAP and other ERP systems (Siebel and PeopleSoft) for data architecture information via SA/ERP paid add-on
  - Microsoft Office products:
    - Powerpoint (SA Presentation Integration provided as add-in, uses REST technology for synchronization of Powerpoint and EA repository)
    - Visio (import from Visio to SA provided at no charge via macro )
    - Microsoft Word and Excel (auto-generation of Word documents and Excel files from EA repository via VBA macros provided in SA, and via reporting engine)

== Technical overview ==
Graphic models and their underlying information are created and stored in a relational database in latest versions of Microsoft SQL Server or SQL Server Express. This database is considered a repository of information and in System Architect parlance is called an encyclopedia.

Users add information to the database via definition dialogs, or importing it from sources of record such as spreadsheets or other tools, and visualize the information on diagrammatic models. As definition information is changed, diagrams depicting the information change to reflect the underlying model information, and vice versa. This is termed in the industry as 'data centric' behavior, which forms the core tenet of Model Based Systems Engineering (MBSE). Users work alone or together in teams on the network. In this multi-user environment, as one user opens a definition or diagram to edit it, other users get a read-only version of this artifact. Options exist to enable users to check out multiple definitions so that they can work on sections of the architecture without anyone else modifying it while they work on it, and administrators to freeze definitions so that they are ‘set in stone’. Users may also work in a stand-alone configuration on their laptop or workstation using SQL Server Express, which is bundled with the product.

A SQL-based query reporting language enables users to build and run reports to answer questions about the information they have modeled, such as what business processes are related to what organizational goals, what applications are used to perform what business processes, what business processes operate on what data entities, what user has modified what information on what date, and so forth.

The information captured in the repository is done so against a metamodel that acts as a template for information to capture and how it is all related. Users may choose industry-standard metamodels, such as those for TOGAF, DoDAF 2, ArchiMate, SysML, UML, etc. Users may customize this meta model, to change or add to the template of information they wish to capture and how things are interrelated.

Models are typically published to a website so that they can be viewed by a wide audience. An add-on tool called SA/Publisher is used to publish websites based on SQL-based queries of the repository using System Architect's reporting language.

== SA/XT ==
System Architect XT (where XT denotes eXtended Team) is a sister product to System Architect rich client, providing a pure web browser interface to read and write access to the repository. SA XT enables remote users with a web browser to:

- Browse the repository in an Explorer tree as they would in the rich-client System Architect.
- Add information into the EA repository, including adding/editing/deleting definition information.
- Create or edit most diagram types.
- Build and run reports against the enterprise architecture to ask it questions—a web GUI is provided for the SQL reporting system.
- View dashboards of information in various forms such as bar charts, pie charts, bubble charts, and tree charts.
- Create personalized dashboards—where each user creates their own set of dashboards.

== System Architect DoDAF, UAF, MODAF, and NAF ==
System Architect provides support for the diagrams, matrices, and work products required to be captured for the US Department of Defense Architecture Framework (DoDAF) version 2.02 (as well as features of the never-officially-released 2.03 version), the Unified Architecture Framework (UAF) version 1.2, the NATO Architecture Framework (NAF) version 4, older versions of DoDAF—DoDAF 1.5 standard and DoDAF 1.5 ABM (supporting the Activity Based Method as specified by MITRE), and the UK Ministry of Defence Architecture Framework (MODAF).
