= MIS AG =

- Type: Private company
- Industry: Software
- Founded: 1988
- Headquarters: Darmstadt, Germany
- Area served: Worldwide
- Products: MIS DecisionWare
- Parent: Infor

MIS AG is a German vendor of corporate performance management software. It was founded in Darmstadt in 1988. Started as a consulting company and reseller of the Applix products, MIS AG developed their own product similar to TM/1. In 1997, MIS AG settled a legal dispute with Applix regarding intellectual property.

MIS DecisionWare is a suite of Business Intelligence software:

- MIS Alea – a MOLAP application server
- MIS onVision (reporting on the Web)
- MIS Plain (reporting in Excel, linked to MIS Alea and Microsoft Analysis Services and SAP B/W)
- MIS Common Object Store (storage of users rights and reports)
- CubeWare Import Master (ETL)
- Bissantz DeltaMiner (Data Mining)

MIS DecisionWare Applications:

- MIS Enterprise Planning
- MIS Balanced Scorecard
- MIS Subsidiary Management
- MIS Financial Consolidation
- MIS Risk Management

In October 2003, MIS AG was acquired by UK-based Systems Union Group.

In August 2006, Systems Union Group together with MIS AG was acquired by Infor.
