= Merck headquarters =

Merck headquarters may refer to

- The headquarters of Merck Group in Darmstadt, Germany
- The headquarters of Merck & Co. in Kenilworth, New Jersey, United States
- Merck Headquarters Building, the former headquarters of Merck & Co. in Whitehouse Station, New Jersey, United States
