= Telelogic =

Swedish software company

Telelogic AB
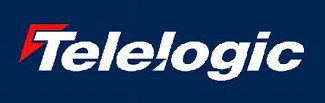
- Type: Private (acquired by IBM)
- Industry: Software services
- Founded: 1983
- Headquarters: Malmö Sweden
- Area served: Worldwide
- Key people: Anders Lidbeck (President & CEO); Bo Dimert (Chairman of the Board)
- Services: Business Process Optimization; Application Lifecycle Management; Model Driven Development
- Revenue: 1,524.9 SEK million FY 2006
- Number of employees: 1,237 (Dec 2007)
- Parent: IBM
- Website: http://www-01.ibm.com/software/rational/support/telelogic/

Telelogic AB was a software business headquartered in Malmö, Sweden. Telelogic was founded in 1983 as a research and development arm of Televerket, the Swedish Department of Telecommunications (now part of TeliaSonera). It was later acquired by IBM Rational, and exists under the IBM software group.

Telelogic had operations in 22 countries and had been publicly traded since 1999. CEO and President in 2001 was Anders Lidbeck. On June 11, 2007, IBM announced that it had made a cash offer to acquire Telelogic. On August 29, 2007, the European Union opened an investigation into the acquisition. On March 5, 2008, European regulators approved the acquisition of Telelogic by the Swedish IBM subsidiary Watchtower AB. On April 28, 2008, IBM completed its purchase of Telelogic.

== Former Products ==
- Focal Point — System for management of product and project portfolios.
- DOORS — Requirements tracking tool.
- System Architect — Enterprise Architecture and Business Architecture modeling tool.
- Tau — SDL and UML modeling tool.
- Synergy — Task-based version control and configuration management system.
- Rhapsody — Systems engineering and executable UML modeling tool.
- DocExpress — Technical documentation tool, discontinued after the acquisition and superseded by Publishing Engine.
- Publishing Engine — Technical documentation tool

All of these products have been continued under IBM's Rational Software division in the systems engineering and Product lifecycle management (PLM) "solutions" software line.

IBM sold System Architect, Focal Point and several other software products to UNICOM Global in 2016.

== Acquisitions ==
Telelogic acquired the following companies between 1999 and 2007:

Date of announcement	Company Name	Type of business
Mar 6, 2006	I-Logix	Embedded modeling
Apr 18, 2005	Popkin Software	Provider of enterprise architecture tools
Apr 13, 2005	Focal Point	Provider of requirements analysis
Dec 16, 2000	ATA	Provider of project documentation & reporting tools
Sep 20, 2000	Continuus	Change & configuration management tools provider
Aug 8, 2000	Quality Systems & Software (QSS)	Requirements Management tools and consultancy provider
Jun 19, 2000	Devisor	Finnish consultant company
May 30, 2000	Certeam	Swedish consultant company
Mar 9, 2000	COOL:Jex	UML analysis & modeling tool
Dec 22, 1999	CS Verilog	Editor of ObjectGeode (a competitor to Tau), SCADE and Logiscope; then a subsidiary of the French company CS Group.
Sep 8, 1999	Real Time Products Ltd.	British software design and services company
