= I-Logix =

Software development company

I-Logix Inc.
- Industry: Software
- Founded: 1987
- Founder: David Harel, Amir Pnueli
- Defunct: 2006
- Fate: Acquired by Telelogic
- Headquarters: Andover, MA, United States; Rehovot, Israel
- Products: Model driven development solutions
- Operating income: $26.5 (2005)
- Net income: $2.9 (2005)
- Number of employees: 133 (2005)
- Parent: IBM

I-Logix was a provider of collaborative Model-driven development (MDD) solutions for systems design and software development, particularly focused on real-time embedded applications. Founded in 1987 and based in Andover, Massachusetts, the company specialized in products that facilitated collaboration among engineers working on embedded systems. Additionally, I-Logix was a member of the UML Partners, a consortium dedicated to the development of the Unified Modeling Language (UML).

== History ==
I-Logix was originally founded in Israel as AdCad Ltd. in April 1984 by David Harel, Amir Pnueli, and brothers Ido and Hagi Lachover. The company's mission was to develop and commercialize a tool to support statecharts and their execution, building on the pioneering work of David Harel at the Weizmann Institute of Science. Harel had conceived the concept of statecharts while working as a consultant on the Lavi Aircraft project for Israel Aerospace Industries. He was tasked with developing a clear method for designing and defining the aircraft's avionics systems, leading to the creation of statecharts and the supporting tool.

In 1986, the company completed the development of a software tool for statecharts called Statemate. At the core of a Statemate model was a functional decomposition controlled by statecharts, allowing users to draw statecharts and other model artifacts, check and analyze them, produce documents, and manage configurations and versions. Statemate could fully execute statecharts and automatically generate executable code, initially in the Ada programming language and later in the C programming language.

In 1987, the company re-formed as a U.S. entity, I-Logix Inc., with AdCad Ltd. becoming its R&D branch, renamed I-Logix Israel, Ltd.

In 1996, I-Logix released Rhapsody, a tool designed for software systems that differed from Statemate by being object-oriented, catering more to software engineers.

In December 1999, I-Logix raised $10 million in funding from North Bridge Venture Partners and Deutsche Telekom to expand its global sales channels.

In 2001, I-Logix acquired the iNOTION product life-cycle management (PLM) technology from KLA-Tencor.

During the 2000s, I-Logix experienced significant growth, establishing itself as a leader in the Embedded Systems and Software Development tools market, securing major clients such as General Motors, Lockheed Martin (for the Joint Strike Fighter F-35 program), and BAE Systems (for the Eurofighter Typhoon program).

In March 2006, I-Logix was acquired by Telelogic AB for $80 million, becoming a business unit for embedded modeling, and the I-Logix name was discontinued. Subsequently, Telelogic AB was acquired by IBM on April 3, 2008, and its products were integrated into IBM's Rational Software unit.

In 2007, the team that developed Statemate received the ACM Software System Award for their pioneering work:

"Statemate was the first commercial computer-aided software engineering tool to successfully overcome the challenges of complex interactive, real-time computer systems, known as reactive systems. The ideas reflected in Statemate underlie many of the most powerful and widely used tools in software and systems engineering today."

— ACM, 2007 Award announcement

== Products ==
Major examples of the tools I-Logix created before it was acquired are Statemate and Rhapsody (now IBM Rational Rhapsody), which both was and is still used by all major automotive and aerospace/defence manufacturers and suppliers. Currently under IBM management Statemate is not gaining new market, while Rhapsody tends to gain its position as a replacement.

== See also ==
- Model driven development
- IBM Rational Rhapsody
