= IBM Cognos Analytics =

Business intelligence suite

- Developer: IBM
- Stable release: 12.0.4 / October 2024; 1 year ago
- Operating system: Microsoft Windows, Linux, UNIX
- Platform: Cross-platform software
- Available in: Multi-lingual
- Type: Business intelligence Data visualization Analytics
- License: Proprietary
- Website: www.ibm.com/products/cognos-analytics

IBM Cognos Analytics (aka Cognos Analytics, formerly known as IBM Cognos Analytics with Watson and IBM Cognos Business Intelligence) is a web-based integrated business intelligence suite by IBM. It provides a toolset for reporting, analytics, scorecarding, and monitoring of events and metrics. The software consists of several components designed to meet the different information requirements in a company. IBM Cognos Analytics has components such as IBM Cognos Framework Manager, IBM Cognos Cube Designer, IBM Cognos Transformer.

== Basic components ==
The elements described below are web-based components that can be accessed from most popular browsers (IBM Cognos specifically supports Mozilla Firefox, Apple Safari, Google Chrome, and Internet Explorer).

=== Cognos Connection ===
Cognos Connection is the Web portal for IBM Cognos BI. It is the starting point for access to all functions provided with the suite. Using this portal, content can be searched in the form of reports, scorecards, and agents, it can be managed, structured, and displayed. In addition, the portal is used for multiple functions, for example to schedule and distribute reports, for creating tasks, administering the server, and the access permissions to content available to different users. You can also create shortcuts, URLs, and pages.

=== Query Studio ===
Query Studio allows simple queries and self-service reports to answer basic business questions. The report layout can be customized and data can be filtered and sorted. Formatting and creation of diagrams is also supported.

=== Report Studio ===
The Report Studio is used to create management reports. It offers two different modes: The professional authoring mode enables users to access the full range of Report Studio functionality. In this mode, users can create any type of report, including charts, maps, lists, and repeat functions. In professional authoring mode all types of Data (relational or multidimensional) can be used, but dynamic data can not be displayed.

The express authoring mode has a simpler user interface, designed for non-technical users. It enables them to create traditional financial or management reports in a more focused user interface. In contrast to the professional authoring mode, the express authoring mode allows the use of dynamic data.

=== Analysis Studio ===
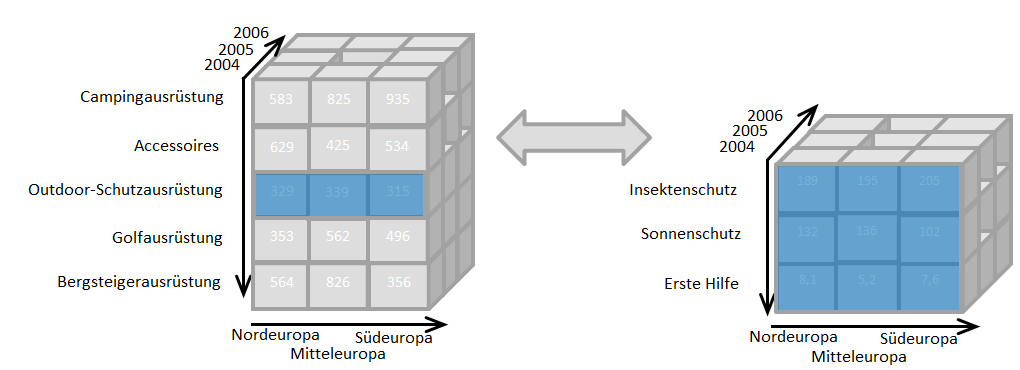
Drill-up and drill-down as example OLAP-functionalities

Users can create analyses of large data sources and search for background information about an event or action. Multidimensional analysis allows identifying trends and understanding of anomalies or deviations, which are not obvious in other types of reports. Drag-and-drop features, elements and key performance indicators can be included in the analysis, rows and columns can be switched, OLAP-functionalities like drill-up and drill-down can be used to get a deeper understanding about the sources of the information used in the analysis.

=== Event Studio ===
The Event Studio is a notification tool that informs about events within the enterprise in real time. Therefore, agents can be created to detect the occurrence of business events or exceptional circumstances, based on the change of specified event- or data conditions. A notification may be served by sending an e-mail, its publication in the portal, or by triggering reports. This can be used to handle failure with notification. It is very robust in nature.

=== Workspace ===
IBM Cognos Workspace (formerly introduced in version 10.1 as IBM Cognos Business Insight and renamed in version 10.2.0) is a web-based interface that allows business users to use existing IBM Cognos content (report objects) to build interactive workspaces for insight and collaboration.

=== Workspace Advanced ===
IBM Cognos Workspace Advanced (formerly introduced in version 10.1 as IBM Cognos Business Insight Advanced and renamed in version 10.2.0) is a web-based interface that allows business users to author/create reports and analyze information.

== Windows-based components ==
- IBM Cognos Framework Manager
- IBM Cognos Cube Designer
- IBM Cognos Transformer
- IBM Cognos Lifecycle Manager
- IBM Cognos Map Manager

== Additional components ==
=== Go! Office ===
The Go! Office component lets users work with IBM Cognos content in their familiar Microsoft Office environment. The component provides access to all IBM Cognos Report contents, including data, metadata, headers and footers, and diagrams. Users can use predefined reports or create new content with Query Studio, Analysis Studio or Report Studio. By importing content into Microsoft Excel users can use the formatting, calculation, and presentation features. The created documents can then be imported using Cognos Connection, published, and made available for other users.

=== Go! Search ===
In Cognos Connection, you can do a full-text search for content contained in reports, analyses, dashboards, metric information, and events. When searching, an index of the prompts, titles, headings, column names, row names, data elements, and other important fields is used as a base. The full-text search in IBM Cognos Go! Search is related to the search in regular search engines such as Google. Users can search operators such as +, - or use "" (quotation marks) to change the default behavior of search queries with multiple words. Search terms are not case sensitive, word, and spelling variants are included in the results. You can also search for a specific type of entry, such as an agent. The search results are sorted in descending order, the entry with the greatest amount of relevant metadata is displayed at the top of the list. In Analysis Studio, Query Studio and IBM Cognos Viewer, you can either perform a full-text search, as also search for content related to the data of the current view.

=== Go! Dashboards ===
With IBM Cognos Go! Dashboard, interactive dashboards containing IBM Cognos content and external data sources can be created to fit the information needs of an individual user.

The following items can be added to a dashboard:
Report objects, they are displayed in a Cognos Viewer portlet. Report parts such as lists, crosstabs, and charts are displayed in interactive portlets. Lists or crosstabs can be displayed as a chart and vice versa. Content can be shown or hidden dynamically by the use of sliders and checkboxes. The Cognos Search portlet allows searching for published content. In addition, Web links, Web pages, RSS feeds, and images can be displayed on the dashboard.

The user interface has two modes: In the interactive mode, existing dashboards are viewed and interacted with, creating and editing of dashboards can be done in assembly mode.

== Business Applications ==
According to an IBM publication from 2006, the NYPD uses Cognos systems for the "Real Time Crime Center" to provide real time visualizations of CompStat crime data.

== See also ==
- Cognos ReportNet (before IBM Cognos BI)
- Oracle Business Intelligence Suite Enterprise Edition
- Business Objects
