= Rhapsody (modeling) =

Software

IBM Engineering Rhapsody
- Developer: IBM
- Stable release: 10.0.3 / 2026-03-26
- Operating system: Cross-platform
- Type: UML tool SysML
- Website: www.ibm.com/products/engineering-rhapsody

IBM Engineering Rhapsody (formerly Rational Rhapsody), a modeling environment based on UML, is a visual development environment for systems engineers and software developers creating real-time or embedded systems and software. Rhapsody uses graphical models to generate software applications in various languages including C, C++, Ada, Java and C#.

Developers use Rhapsody to understand and elaborate requirements, create model designs using industry standard languages (UML, SysML, AUTOSAR, DoDAF, MODAF, UPDM), validate functionality early in development, and automate delivery of high structured products.

Rhapsody Model Manager is a web based application that stakeholders, developers, and other team members use to collaborate on the design of products, software, and systems. The product contains a server that hosts model designs which have been developed in Rhapsody. A client extension component included with Rhapsody allows users to connect to a Design Manager server. After connecting to the server, models can be moved into project areas with specific modeling domains based on the industry standard languages supported by Rhapsody. Rhapsody Model Manager also integrates with the IBM solution for Engineering Lifecycle Management (ELM). In this environment, artifacts can be associated with other lifecycle resources such as requirements (via IBM Engineering Requirements Management DOORS, DOORS Next), change requests and change sets of sources (the IBM Engineering Workflow Management), and Quality Assurance test cases (the IBM Engineering Test Management). Global Configuration control allows different teams and different projects to interact in a synchronised setup that integrates deliveries and baselines within each of the tools in the CLM solution.

== History ==
Rhapsody was first released in 1996 by Israeli software company I-Logix Inc. Rhapsody was developed as an object-oriented tool for modeling and executing statecharts, based on work done by David Harel at the Weizmann Institute of Science, who was the first to develop the concept of hierarchical, parallel, and broadcasting statecharts.

In 2006, I-Logix's shareholders sold the company to Swedish software company Telelogic AB. Rhapsody became a Rational Software product after the acquisition of Telelogic AB in 2008, like all former Telelogic products. Since the rebranding, Rational Rhapsody has been integrated with the IBM Rational Systems and Software Engineering Solution.

Rational Rhapsody Design Manager was first released in June, 2011 by IBM. In December 2011, the product was integrated as a design component in IBM Engineering Lifecycle Management solution.

== See also ==
- List of UML tools
