= Cognos ReportNet =

Web-based business intelligence software

- Original authors: Cognos, an IBM Company
- Release: September 2003
- Final release: 8.1.2 MR2 / March 31, 2009; 17 years ago
- Operating system: Multiple
- Platform: Multiple
- Available in: Multi-lingual
- Type: Business intelligence
- Website: www-01.ibm.com/software/data/cognos/products/reportnet/

Cognos ReportNet (CRN) was a web-based software product for creating and managing ad hoc and custom-made reports. ReportNet was developed by the Ottawa-based company Cognos (formerly Cognos Incorporated), an IBM company. The web-based reporting tool was launched in September 2003. Since IBM's acquisition of Cognos, ReportNet has been renamed IBM Cognos ReportNet like all other Cognos products.

ReportNet uses web services standards such as XML and Simple Object Access Protocol and also supports dynamic HTML and Java. ReportNet is compatible with multiple databases including Oracle, SAP, Teradata, Microsoft SQL server, DB2 and Sybase. The product provides interface in over 10 languages, has Web Services architecture to meet the needs of multi-national, diversified enterprises and helps reduce total cost of ownership. Multiple versions of Cognos ReportNet have since been released by the company. Cognos ReportNet was awarded the Software and Information Industry Association (SIIA) 2005 Codie awards for the "Best Business Intelligence or Knowledge Management Solution" category. CRN's capabilities have been further used in IBM Cognos 8 BI (2005), the latest reporting tool. CRN comes with its own software development kit (SDK).

== Launch ==
Early adopters of Cognos ReportNet for their corporate reporting needs included Bear Stearns, BMW and Alfred Publishing. Around this same time of launch, Cognos competitor Business Objects released version 6.1 of its enterprise reporting tool. Cognos ReportNet has been successful since its launch, raising revenues in 2004 from licensing fees.

== Controversy ==
Cognos rival Business Objects announced in 2005 that BusinessObjects XI significantly outperformed Cognos ReportNet in benchmark tests conducted by VeriTest, an independent software testing firm. The tests performed showed Cognos ReportNet performed poorly when processing styled reports, complex business reports and combination of both. The tests reported a massive 21 times higher report throughput for BusinessObjects XI than Cognos ReportNet at capacity loads. Cognos soon dismissed the claims by stating Business Objects dictated the environment and testing criteria and Cognos did not provide the software to participate in benchmark test. Cognos later performed their own test to demonstrate Cognos ReportNet capabilities.

== Components ==
- Cognos Report Studio – A Web-based product for creating complex professional looking reports.
- Cognos Query Studio - A Web-based product for creating ad-hoc reports.
- Cognos Framework Manager – A metadata modeling tool to create BI metadata for reporting and dashboard applications.
- Cognos Connection – Main portal used to access reports, schedule reports and perform administrator activities.

== Versions ==
- Cognos ReportNet 1.1 – Java EE-style professional web-based authoring tool. (base version)
- Cognos ReportNet IBM Special Edition – comes with an embedded version of IBM WebSphere as its application server and IBM DB2 as its data store.
- Cognos Linux – for Intel-based Linux platforms.

== See also ==
- IBM Cognos Analytics
