= Firetide =

American technology provider

- Company type: Division
- Industry: Wireless Networking
- Founded: 1 January 2003
- Headquarters: Campbell, California
- Key people: Corry Hong (CEO)
- Parent: UNICOM Global
- Website: www.firetide.com

Firetide is an American company that provides wireless mesh network technology internationally. It is a division of UNICOM Global. Based in the Silicon Valley, Firetide designs and sells hardware and software for wireless technology.

== Corporate history ==
Firetide was founded in 2001, under the name Landmark Networks, to provide hardware and software for wireless infrastructure mesh networks. In 2003 the name changed to Firetide, which would "better reflect the company's mission and culture". In 2004, the company moved from Hawaii to Los Gatos, CA.

Firetide, Inc. was acquired by UNICOM Global on May 19, 2014.

Firetide Inc. is currently headquartered in Campbell, CA, CA with a R&D office in Bangalore, India.

== Hardware ==
HotPort 7000 Series. Indoor and outdoor wireless mesh node, equipped with dual 802.11n MIMO radios. The radios are able to operate at 2.4, 4.9 and 5.0 GHz and allows for a throughput of up to 400 Mbit/s.

FWB-200 Series. Indoor and outdoor wireless point-to-point bridges, equipped with dual 802.11n MIMO radios. The point-to-point bridges are used to connect distant, wireless networks to each other.

HotPoint 5000 Series. Indoor and outdoor wireless access points, equipped with dual 802.11n MIMO radios. The access points allow for a wireless Wi-Fi network to be connected to the mesh. Software development stopped in 2015.

HotClient 2000 Series. Indoor and outdoor wireless customer premises equipment. A product that extends the range of a Wi-Fi network.

Firetide FWC 2050 WLAN Controller. A product that can control up to 50 access points and that provides configuration of the access points through central management. It is controlled through a web-interface.

Firetide IVS 100. Integrated video solution, a combined IP-camera and mesh node.

== Software ==
HotView Pro. Software that centrally manages the mesh nodes and the other Firetide hardware connected to the mesh network.

Firetide Mobility Controller. Software that enables Firetide's mesh to be compatible with mobile units, such as connecting to a moving subway train.

== Routing protocol ==
Firetide use their own, proprietary AutoMesh routing protocol to control the data flow in the mesh.

== Notable installations ==
In 2006, Firetide announced that they were going to supply their technology to Singapore's Wireless@SG project. The project's goal was to install a nationwide network to enable public Wi-Fi as well as video and voice traffic.

In 2007, Firetide installed its wireless mesh technology on the construction site of Burj Khalifa (Burj Dubai) to allow communication between workers via VOIP radio, replacing walkie talkies which presented communication issues at high altitudes.

In 2009, Firetide installed a wireless mesh network in Seoul Metropolitan Subway. The request from the South Korean subway operator for live camera coverage came after a fatal arson in 2003. Firetide technology provided wireless connection to the station and the moving trains. The systems included cameras on the train stations and on the trains. The design aimed to avoid more fatal accidents by distributing real-time video feed both to the train drivers and to the operators in the command central. The installation included 1000 mesh nodes as well as 650 cameras.

January 2009, Firetide installed a system at California State University, Long Beach.

== Partnership ==
In May 2010, Firetide announced an Original Equipment Manufacturer OEM agreement with Netgear. The license agreement enabled for Netgear to use Firetide's WLAN Controller software in their new portfolio of WLAN controllers.
