= UNICOM Global =

US-based IT company

UNICOM Global, Inc.

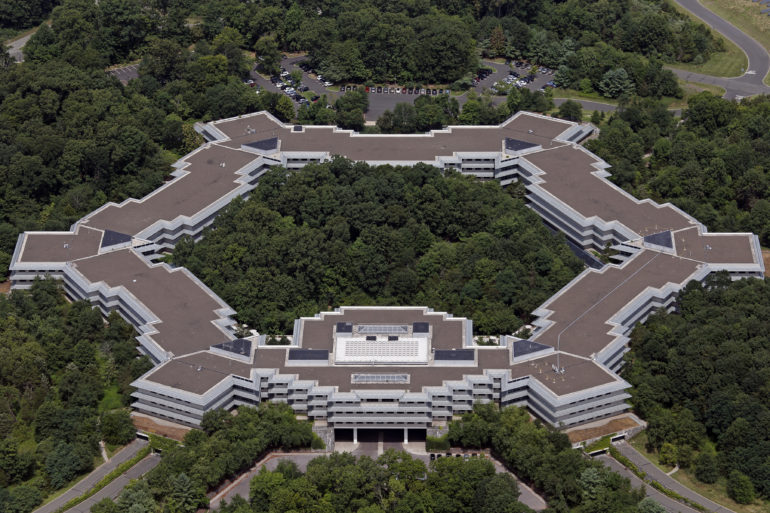
- UNICOM Science & Technology Park in Whitehouse Station, New Jersey
- Type: Private
- Industry: Digital Transformation; Cloud computing Artificial intelligence Robotics; Computer hardware Computer software Software modernization Enterprise Architecture; Application Portfolio Management
- Founded: 1981; 45 years ago
- Founder: Corry Hong
- Headquarters: Mission Hills, California, United States
- Services: Consulting; Outsourcing; Professional services; Managed services
- Divisions: UNICOM Government, Inc., UNICOM Engineering, USRobotics, Firetide, Memeo, UNICOM Systems, Macro4, and Eden.
- Website: www.unicomglobal.com

UNICOM Global, Inc. is an American multinational technology corporation headquartered in Mission Hills, California. The company was founded by Corry Hong in Los Angeles, California in 1981 to develop AUTOMON/CICS and related products for the CICS mainframe marketplace. UNICOM Global has grown since then by acquiring publicly-traded and private IT organizations and products, and through property acquisition. Corry Hong was born in Seoul, South Korea and immigrated to the United States at age 20, studying computer science at Pierce College in Los Angeles. He is the CEO and president of the company.

UNICOM Global operates across industry sectors including aerospace and defense, banking, chemical industries, consumer electronics, energy and utilities, healthcare, Fintech, insurance, manufacturing, media and entertainment, oil and gas, retail, telecom, transportation, and Federal, State, and Local Governments.

== Corporate structure ==
UNICOM Global consists of the following major divisions:

- UNICOM Government, Inc. (UGI) -- a provider of information technology products and professional services to Federal, State, and Local Governments. In 2015, Unicom Government was one of 6 vendors jointly awarded a $652 million U.S. Army contract for enterprise IT modernization. UNICOM Government is the former NASDAQ-listed GTSI, whom UNICOM Global acquired in June 2012 (see History section, below).
- UNICOM Engineering – its division that designs and builds purpose-built application platforms and appliances, and provides deployment services for software developers and OEMs. UNICOM Engineering is the former NASDAQ-listed Network Engines Inc, more commonly known as NEI Corporation, which UNICOM Global acquired in September 2012 (see History section, below).
- USRobotics – its division that focuses on data communications products and solutions. USRobotics has origins as a pioneer in internet networking capabilities.
- Firetide – its division that designs and sells software and hardware focusing on Wireless Mesh network technology.
- Memeo – its division that builds products for File Sharing, Big Data, and Data Warehousing.
- UNICOM Systems – its software division focused on digital transformation products and services. This division includes a number of software products that UNICOM acquired from IBM: System Architect, Focal Point, PurifyPlus, SPSS Survey (now UNICOM Intelligence), solidDB, Cognos Finance (now UNICOM Finance), and the PowerHouse programming language.
- Macro 4 – its division that manages international operations and builds software for enterprise information management, customer communication management (CCM), and mainframe modernization. Macro 4 also builds the Universal Gateway (uniGW) product. Macro 4 was a publicly traded company that UNICOM Global acquired in 2009 (see history section below). The Macro 4 division includes:
  - SoftLanding Systems – This division develops IBM i software and systems management products. UNICOM Global acquired SoftLanding Systems in 2006, which was one of the "Big Three" change management vendors on the IBM i platform.
  - iET Solutions—which builds ITIL-Aligned IT Service Management (ITSM) and Software Asset Management (SAM) products.
  - DETEC—which develops and markets software for intercorporate communication as well as for B2B and B2C communication.
- Eden—its capital, mergers and acquisitions, financial services, and real estate division.

== Headquarters and Operations ==
UNICOM Global operates at 31 locations in 17 countries. It owns and operates the following IT Corporate Parks, Innovation Centers, and IT Villages:

- UNICOM Plaza – UNICOM Global Corporate Headquarters in Mission Hills, California.
- UNICOM Technology Park (UTP) – the former Washington Technology Park that UNICOM acquired in 2015, which is now a research and innovation center, as well as UNICOM Government's corporate headquarters.
- UNICOM Science & Technology Park (USTP) – the former Merck Headquarters Building that UNICOM acquired in 2018, which is now a research and innovation center.
- UNICOM Innovation Park -- formerly The Martingale, an 11-story class A office park in Schaumburg, Illinois, purchased by UNICOM in January, 2023, and now being established as a research & innovation center.
- Pickfair Executive Meeting Center – the former Pickfair Estate in Beverly Hills built by Douglas Fairbanks and Mary Pickford, which is now an executive conference center.
- Roripaugh Ranch – an 800-acre planned community located in California between Los Angeles and San Diego, that is being established as a UNICOM IT Village.
- The Orangery, Crabbet Park IT Center in the southern suburbs of London, UK.

== Corporate history ==
UNICOM Global was founded by Corry Hong in Los Angeles, California in 1981 to develop AUTOMON/CICS and related products for the CICS mainframe marketplace. Corry Hong was born in Seoul, South Korea and immigrated to the United States at age 20, studying computer science at Pierce College in Los Angeles.

In April 1985, UNICOM Global introduced AUTOMON/CICS, an automated action tool for the CICS MVS environment. UNICOM Global achieved success with the AUTOMON product: in April 1988, AUTOMON/CICS was selected to assure systems availability and productivity at the Games for the XXIV Olympiad held in 1988 in Seoul, South Korea. In April 1994, AUTOMON/CICS was nominated for the International Computer Programs (ICP) Million Dollar award.

UNICOM Global grew through the following acquisitions:

Number	Acquisition date	Company, Product or Property	Business	Country	References
1	December 1997	Acquired commercial plaza, and established UNICOM Plaza.	Commercial property	United States	
2	July 1998	Acquired 14 MVS & VSE Products from SofTouch Systems	Mainframe computer software	United States	
3	February 2000	Acquired CICS Resource Definition Online product from SofTouch Systems	Mainframe computer software	United States	
4	July 2000	Acquired 16 MVS, VM and CICS products from Technologic Software Concepts, Inc.	Mainframe computer software	United States	
5	October 2000	Acquired Wingsweep, a 50-acre sports complex, training and corporate retreat facility in Temecula, California.	Commercial property	United States	
6	April 2005	Acquired Pickfair Estate in Beverly Hills, California, and established it as a corporate event facility.	Commercial property	United States	
7	September 2006	Acquired Softlanding, which was one of the "Big Three" change management vendors on the IBM i platform.	Mainframe computer software	United States	
8	November 2006	Acquired the assets of Eden Communications, Inc. an IT service management software company.	Service Management software	United States	
9	December 2006	Acquired a 5-acre research and development facility in New Hampshire, establishing it as UNICOM Center.	Commercial property	United States	
10	February 2008	Acquired Roripaugh Ranch, a 70-acre planned community/green technology village project in Temecula, California.	Commercial property	United States	
11	January 2009	Acquired Macro 4 plc, a global software and services company.	Public Company	United Kingdom	
12	September 2011	Acquired the assets of Illustro Systems International, a Dallas-based mainframe software company.	Mainframe computer software	United States	
13	September 2011	Acquired iET Solutions, LLC from Platinum Equity, LLC. iET provides IT Service Management (ITSM) and Software Asset Management solutions for midsize and large enterprises.	Service Management software and Software Asset Management	United States	
14	June 2012	Acquired NASDAQ-listed GTSI to form the UNICOM Government division.	Public Company	United States	
15	September 2012	Acquired NASDAQ-listed Network Engines Inc. (NEI) to form UNICOM Engineering.	Public Company	United States	
16	July 2012	Acquired DETEC Software GmbH, a provider of document composition technology, from Beta Systems Software AG.	Document composition software	Germany	
17	June 2013	Acquired USRobotics, Inc., the provider of Internet and connectivity products, from Platinum Equity.	Public Company	United States	
18	June 2013	Acquired Commercial division of Acentia, LLC, -- Cisco Silver Partner -- a provider of network and infrastructure services to education, healthcare and state and local government agencies.	Public Company	United States	
19	December 2013	Acquired Cognos Application Development Tools suite of products from IBM Corporation, including PowerHouse, Axiant 4GL and PowerHouse Web.	PowerHouse (programming_language)	United States	
20	March 2014	Acquired Cloud-Based Secure File Sharing and Data Protection Solutions from Memeo, Inc.	File Sharing software	United States	
21	May 2014	Acquired Firetide, a Silicon Valley–based Wireless Network company.	Privately Held Company selling Wireless mesh network product.	United States	
22	June 2014	Acquired the Visual and Unified Communications Division from Microtechnologies, LLC.	IT Service Management	United States	
23	June 2014	Acquired solidDB In-memory database product from IBM.	In-Memory Database product	United States	
24	August 2014	Acquired Cognos Finance assets from IBM. Rebranded to UNICOM Finance.	Business intelligence product	United States	
25	December 2014	Acquired Rational Focal Point from IBM. Rebranded to UNICOM Focal Point.	Application Portfolio Management and Product Management product	United States	
26	December 2014	Acquired Rational PurifyPlus from IBM.	Memory debugger product	United States	
27	October 2015	Acquired SPSS Data Collection from IBM. Rebranded product to UNICOM Intelligence.	Survey data collection product	United States	
28	December 2015	Acquired Washington Technology Park, and established it as UNICOM Technology Park (UTP).	Commercial property	United States	
29	December 2015	Acquired System Architect from IBM.	Enterprise Architecture and Systems Architecture product.	United States	
30	December 2015	Established an Intellectual Property License Agreement with IBM for Content Manager OnDemand.	Content management product.	United States	
31	December 2015	Established an Intellectual Property License Agreement with IBM for InfoSphere Optim.	Data management product.	United States	
32	March 2016	Acquired WebSphere Multichannel Bank Transformation Toolkit from IBM.	Digital transformation product.	United States	
33	March 2016	Established an Intellectual Property License Agreement with IBM for Omegamon (Omegamon for z/OS, Dashboard Edition on z/OS, Mainframe Networks).	Mainframe computer software	United States	
34	June 2016	Established an Intellectual Property License Agreement with IBM for Cognos Planning.	Analytics product.	United States	
35	June 2016	Established an Intellectual Property License Agreement with IBM for Content Manager (CM8).	Content Management product.	United States	
36	July 2016	Introduced VeroFiles, a Cloud file storage product.	Cloud storage product.	United States	
37	February 2016	Established UNICOM Corporation in Las Vegas.	Commercial property	United States	
38	October 2018	Purchased the former Merck Headquarters Building and established it as the UNICOM Science & Technology Park (USTP).	Commercial property	United States	
39	February 2019	Established UNICOM Global Logistics, Inc. in Las Vegas.	Logistics company	United States	
40	January 2023	Purchased 'The Martingale', class A commercial office tower at 231 N Martingale Rd, Schaumburg, IL, and established it as UNICOM Innovation Park.	Commercial property	United States	
41	July 2023	Established a Regional Headquarters for the Southeast Asia region in Singapore.	Commercial property	Southeast Asia	
42	September 2025	Acquires NORESCO’s solar capacity and large scale Battery Energy Storage System (“BESS”) to power 1-Gigawatt Hyperscale Data Center Campus at Whitehouse Station.	Photovoltaic power station	United States	

== See also ==
- Pickfair estate in Beverly Hills, California, owned by UNICOM
- Merck Headquarters Building, owned by UNICOM
