= UNICOM Government =

UNICOM Government, Inc.
- Founded: 1983
- Headquarters: Chantilly, Virginia, United States
- Parent: UNICOM Global
- Website: www.unicomgov.com

UNICOM Government, Inc. (UGI) is an American information technology (IT) hardware company. It is a sub-division of UNICOM Global. It was formerly GTSI Corp, founded in 1983 and acquired by UNICOM Global in 2012 (see history).

== Overview ==
UNICOM Government provides information technology and professional services for the US Federal, State, and Local Governments. UNICOM Government, Inc. is informally known by its abbreviation, UGI.

== History ==
- UNICOM Government was founded in 1983 as Government Technology Services Incorporated (GTSI).

The six co-founders of GTSI were George Tate, Hal (Ashton) Lashlee, Glenn Johnson, Kevin O'Donnell, George Hennessy and Lyle Mall. GTSI's mission was to sell microcomputer software through a GTSI retail store, located inside the Washington DC Gereral Account Office building of the federal government of the United States.

- By 1986, it was working with local, state and federal government agencies.
- In 1994, it introduced the first browser-based government contract catalog.
- In 1996, it registered its URL and engaged in e-commerce.
- In 1999, it launched the first government IT portal, governmentIT.com, featuring the latest in IT applications for government employees.
- In June 2012, it was acquired by UNICOM Global, after UNICOM completed a tender offer for outstanding shares of GTSI common stock for $7.75 per share in cash; GTSI became a wholly owned subsidiary of UNICOM, and GTSI stock was delisted from NASDAQ. GTSI Corp. was renamed UNICOM Government, Inc. in 2013, and is now a division of its parent company, UNICOM Global, Inc.
- In June 2014, UGI was awarded a $774 million contract extension to provide U.S. Army Technology Solutions as part of the Army’s ITES-2H contract that had a $6.763 billion procurement ceiling.
- In April 2021, the Defense Intelligence Agency (DIA) Site III award was awarded to Team Business Integra (Team BI), which included UGI as a team member. This 10-year, $12.6 billion dollar, multi-award IDIQ for Information Technology Solutions includes several Task Orders for the delivery of IT and technical support services to the Defense Intelligence Agency (DIA) and the National Geospatial-Intelligence Agency (NGA).
