= Value stream =

Principle in economics

A value stream is the set of actions that take place to add value to a customer from the initial request through realization of value by the customer. The value stream begins with the initial concept, moves through various stages of development and on through delivery and support. A value stream always begins and ends with a customer. Value stream is usually aligned with company processes.

Value streams are artifacts within business architecture that allow a business to specify the value proposition derived by an external (e.g., customer) or internal stakeholder from an organization. A value stream depicts the stakeholders initiating and involved in the value stream, the stages that create specific value items, and the value proposition derived from the value stream. The value stream is depicted as an end-to-end collection of value-adding activities that create an overall result for a customer, stakeholder, or end-user.

In modeling terms, those value-adding activities are represented by value stream stages, each of which creates and adds incremental stakeholder value items from one stage to the next. While value streams are referenced in multiple methodologies, there is increasing agreement on the description and the purpose of value streams as a core domain of business architecture and scaled agile framework, which has since been applied by multiple standards bodies.

== Purpose ==
Value streams are a component of the business ecosystem that describe how a stakeholder – often a customer – receives value from an organization. As opposed to many previous attempts at describing stakeholder value, value streams take the perspective of the initiating or triggering stakeholder rather than an internal value chain or process perspective. From this outside-in view, value streams can be cross-mapped to enabling business capabilities that describe what and how, respectively, an organization must do to deliver value to the stakeholder.

== Components ==
Value streams represent end-to-end views on how value is achieved for a given external or internal stakeholder. Value streams are named with a definition of the value proposition provided to stakeholders. Stakeholders within a value stream can take two forms:

- A triggering stakeholder is the person or organization that initiates and, as a rule, participates in the value stream.
- A participating stakeholder is a person or organization that either provides or facilitates aspects of the value delivered in the value stream, or that may receive ancillary value from the value stream.

Additionally, value streams are composed of value stream stages, which represent iterative value items that are accrued to deliver value throughout the value stream, ultimately delivering a value proposition.

=== Commonly associated concepts ===
Value streams are often seen in a form in which they are cross-mapped to stakeholders and capabilities. These cross-mappings allow practitioners to better identify the people and organizations to whom – or from which – value is provided. For example, enabling capabilities, associated with each value stream stage, produce outcomes that collectively contribute to the creation of a value item within that stage. In other words, the capabilities do the work to achieve each value item at each stage. In addition, many practitioners align value streams and value stream stages to business capabilities. This facilitates alignment of how an organization provides value to the internal view of what a company does.

=== Misconceptions ===
There are multiple misconceptions around the concept of value streams. These are outlined at a high level below, with references to additional information on each. For clarification:

- Value streams are usually not processes in the sense that the concern is "how value is achieved" rather than "how it's done".

The Lean value stream is a diagrammatic representation of the sequence of activities required to design, produce, and deliver a good or service to a customer. Despite the similarity in name to the Business Architecture value stream, the Lean value stream’s primary purpose is to document, analyze, and improve the flow of information or materials required to produce a product or service for a customer. It is not designed (nor is it well suited) to broader architectural purposes – namely, decomposing down to the critical activities (or stages) that progressively combine to produce value for a stakeholder, or cross-mapping those value stream stages to the enabling business capabilities.

- Value streams are not internally focused. Some methodologies reference value streams as delivering value to an internal stakeholder. While this can hold true within a specified context, the goal of most practitioners is to focus on stakeholders outside of an organization.
- Value streams are not customer journey maps. While both value streams and journey maps take the perspective of the external stakeholder, they seek to describe different sets of information. Customer journey maps typically seek to describe the emotions, intent, and individual interactions with a customer.

== Alignment to agile methodologies ==
The concept of a value stream is especially important to agile methodologies, which often seek to maximize a focus on customer or business value. Specific forms of agile methodologies, such as the scaled agile framework, incorporate the value stream as a way to create a foundational view of the business from which agile work can be completed. This approach encourages a common level of understanding that allows multiple disciplines to interact, creating a more consistent, simplified view of the organization.

== See also ==
- Business architecture
- DevOps
- Value-stream mapping
