= Merck Headquarters Building =

Office building in Whitehouse Station, New Jersey

Merck & Co., Inc. World Headquarters
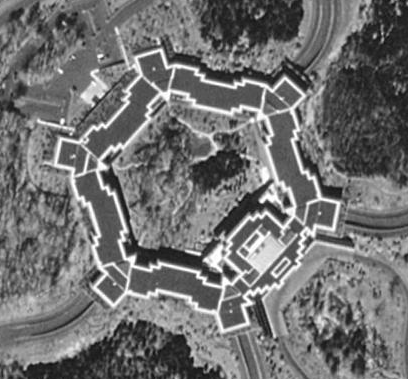
- Aerial view
- Interactive map of the Merck & Co., Inc. World Headquarters area

General information
- Type: Corporate headquarters
- Architectural style: Modernist
- Location: Whitehouse Station in Readington, New Jersey, United States, 1 Merck Drive, Lebanon, New Jersey
- Coordinates: 40.640824°N 74.777627°W
- Construction started: 1989
- Completed: 1990
- Inaugurated: 1992
- Owner: UNICOM Science and Technology Park, Inc.

Technical details
- Floor count: 3
- Floor area: 1,600,000 sq ft (150,000 m^{2}), i.e. 900,000 sq ft (84,000 m^{2}) of office space, 700,000 sq ft (65,000 m^{2}) underground parking

Design and construction
- Architect: Kevin Roche John Dinkeloo and Associates, LLC
- Civil engineer: Clarke & Rapuano
- Other designers: Edmund Hollander and Maryanne Connelly

The former Merck & Co. headquarters building is a modernist office building located in the Whitehouse Station section of Readington Township, New Jersey, United States. It was designed by Kevin Roche John Dinkeloo and Associates, LLC in the late 1980s for the Merck & Co. pharmaceutical company. Over the years it became well known for its various environmentally friendly features.

In October 2012, Merck & Co. announced that starting in 2014 it would move its headquarters to the Schering-Plough site (formerly belonging to Ciba, Ciba-Geigy and Novartis) in Summit, New Jersey, acquired in the November 2009 acquisition of Schering, and planned to close the Whitehouse Station headquarters building upon completion of the move in 2015. In October 2013, Merck & Co. reversed course and said its headquarters would move to Kenilworth, New Jersey, and that the 88-acre (36 ha) Summit campus would be sold after being vacated on December 31, 2014.

In July 2018, UNICOM Global announced that their division UNICOM Corporation had signed an agreement with Merck & Co. to purchase the entire Merck property at Whitehouse Station, with the acquisition expected to close in October 2018. The completion of the acquisition was announced on October 1, 2018. The property was renamed UNICOM Science and Technology Park (USTP).

== Building history ==
Constructed in 1990 as a home for the headquarters staff of Merck & Co., the building is most recognizable for its hexagon shape and its nature setting. The main building was constructed with a 600-foot (180 m) wide clearing at its center, filled with old-growth trees saved during the construction phase. Further, Merck & Co. placed the parking structure underground and created a temporary nursery on-site for the trees removed during construction, in order to make the facility a "corporate cottage in the woods". The building was originally set on 460 acres (190 ha) of property and has since been expanded to a 1,000-acre (4.0 km^{2}) campus with auxiliary buildings. The initial site plan foresaw the subsequent addition of two buildings to create a grid of three connected hexagons, however, after a change in management, it was indicated that further construction in the original style would not occur. Instead a conventional office block was built adjacent to it known as "Whitehouse Station West".

In the center of the building there is a park with a small lawned sitting area containing a statue given by Merck Germany.

Prior to moving to this location, the Merck & Co. headquarters was located in Rahway, New Jersey. The Whitehouse Station campus is located on an old dairy farm and the surrounding area is known as a more suburban/rural setting than the area around the Rahway campus. As a result, Merck & Co. included amenities such as on-site child-care, a fitness center, baseball fields, and a medical services center for employees.

== Solar initiative ==
In 2008, Merck & Co. installed a 1.6-megawatt solar power system consisting of 7,000 panels on 7 acres (2.8 ha) of property. Among the largest installations at a corporate headquarters, the system is also the largest ground-mounted solar power tracking system east of the Mississippi River. In all, it will provide 7% of the site's power and is expected to "reduce carbon dioxide emissions by more than 1,300 tons per year."
