= Applix =

Applix, Inc.
- Industry: Computer Software
- Founded: 1983
- Fate: Acquired by Cognos, October 25, 2007; Acquired by IBM, January 31, 2008
- Headquarters: Westborough, Massachusetts, United States
- Products: Applix TM1; Applix WebExecutive Viewer; Business Analytics Platform
- Owner: IBM
- Website: www-01.ibm.com/software/analytics/cognos/

Applix Inc. was a computer software company founded in 1983 based in Westborough, Massachusetts that published Applix TM1, a multi-dimensional online analytical processing (MOLAP) database server, and related presentation tools, including Applix Web and Applix Executive Viewer. Together, Applix TM1, Applix Web and Applix Executive Viewer were the three core components of the Applix Business Analytics Platform. (Executive Viewer was subsequently discontinued by IBM.)

On October 25, 2007, Applix was acquired by Cognos. Cognos rebranded all Applix products under its name following the acquisition. On January 31, 2008, Cognos was itself acquired by IBM.

Prior to OLAP industry consolidation in 2007, Applix was the purest OLAP vendor among publicly traded independent business intelligence vendors, and had the greatest growth rate. TM1 is now marketed as IBM Cognos TM1; version 10.2 became publicly available on September 13, 2013.

== Products and technology ==
Applix TM1 is enterprise planning software used for collaborative planning, budgeting and forecasting, as well as analytical and reporting applications. Data in TM1 is stored and represented as multidimensional cubes, with data being stored at the "leaf" level. Computations on the leaf data are performed in real-time (for example, to aggregate numbers up a dimensional hierarchy). IBM Cognos TM1 also includes a data orchestration environment for accessing external data and systems, as well as capabilities designed for common business planning and budgeting requirements (e.g. workflow, top-down adjustments).

== See also ==
- Applixware
