= Cognos =

Defunct Canadian software company

- Wordmark of company before IBM acquisition
- Type: Brand (of IBM)
- Industry: Software
- Founded: 1969
- Founder: Alan Rushforth; Peter Glenister
- Defunct: 2009
- Fate: Acquired
- Headquarters: Ottawa, Ontario, Canada
- Key people: Rob Ashe, General Manager, IBM Business Analytics
- Products: Business intelligence Data visualization Analytics
- Website: Official website

Cognos Incorporated was an Ottawa, Ontario-based company making business intelligence (BI) and performance management (PM) software. Founded in 1969, at its peak Cognos employed almost 3,500 people and served more than 23,000 customers in over 135 countries until being acquired by IBM on January 31, 2008. While no longer an independent company, the Cognos name continues to be applied to IBM's line of business intelligence and performance management products.

== History ==
Cognos was founded in 1969 by Alan Rushforth and Peter Glenister. Michael U. Potter joined Cognos in 1972, and was its chief executive officer from 1975 until 1995. It began as a consulting company for the Canadian federal government and offered its first software product, QUIZ, in 1979. During the Canadian recession in the 1980s, Cognos shifted its focus from consulting to software sales.

Originally Quasar Systems Limited, it adopted the Cognos name in 1982. Cognos is a fragment scissored off the Latin word "cognosco," which means "knowledge from personal experience". Cognos became a public company in August 1986 trading on the Toronto Stock Exchange as CSN and on the NASDAQ as COGN. On January 31, 2008, Cognos was acquired by IBM and was no longer an independent company.

In 1995, Ron Zambonini was named CEO. Cognos experienced growth through its business intelligence products for local area networks (LAN), but failed to anticipate a sudden increase in competition. After Cognos issued a notice informing shareholders of a slowdown in growth, many sold their shares, causing prices to fall quickly.

This prompted Cognos to build its web technology through the acquisition of other companies rather than internal research and development. In September 2007, Cognos announced that it would be acquiring Applix. It had previously acquired Right Information Systems (4Thought), Interweave (Impromptu Web Query), Relational Matters (DecisionStream), Scientific Time Sharing Corporation (LEX2000), NoticeCast, Adaytum, Frango, DataBeacon, and Celequest.

In January 2010, as part of a reorganization of IBM Software Group, software from Cognos and recently acquired SPSS were brought together to create the Business Analytics division.

On December 31, 2013, UNICOM Systems, a division of UNICOM Global acquired the PowerHouse product line including PowerHouse 4GL Server, Axiant® 4GL and PowerHouse Web, so Powerhouse products would no longer be part of the IBM product set.

== Federal investigation ==
In August 2007, the Massachusetts state Information Technology Division awarded Cognos a $13 million contract for performance management software. This followed a 2006 $4.5 million state contract awarded to Cognos by the Massachusetts Department of Education. These contracts came under scrutiny from the State Ethics Commission and the office of state Inspector General Gregory Sullivan when several conflicts of interest surrounding Speaker of the Massachusetts House of Representatives Salvatore DiMasi and his accountant Richard Vitale came to light.

In the course of these investigations, a payoff from former Cognos sales executive Joseph Lally in the amount of $600,000 was found to have been made to Vitale's company WN Advisors. Vitale and WN Advisors were not registered as state lobbyists and did not disclose the payments, the bulk of which were apparently made on the same day that the state wired funds for the multi-million-dollar contracts to Cognos. The disposition of the funds has not been disclosed and the State has rescinded the contracts. IBM, who now owns Cognos, has refunded the improperly awarded $13 million paid to Cognos. A second close associate of DiMasi's, lawyer Steven Topazio, was placed on a two-year $5,000 a month retainer for unspecified purposes. This retainer stopped the same month as the second Cognos contract was awarded.

In addition to the payoffs made to close associates of DiMasi, it is known that Vitale helped arrange a below-market mortgage for DiMasi, which violated state Ethics laws.

On December 17, 2008, The Boston Globe confirmed that the State investigations were being joined by a Federal Grand Jury probe investigating the allegations and potential violations of Federal law. On June 2, 2009, DiMasi, Vitale, Lally, and Cognos lobbyist Richard McDonough were indicted "on a battery of...corruption charges" as a result of that probe.

== Acquisition of Cognos by IBM ==
In 2007, following SAP's acquisition of Business Objects and Oracle's acquisition of Hyperion Solutions, IBM announced its acquisition of Cognos in November for $4.9 billion. It continued to operate as a wholly owned subsidiary (Cognos, an IBM company) until January 1, 2009, when it was absorbed into the IBM Infosphere product line under IBM Information Management Software brand within the company's Software Group. The software is now called "IBM Cognos Analytics" and "IBM Planning Analytics" or CA and PA.

== BI market ==
IBM's purchase of Cognos and other business intelligence software vendors was a step in establishing IBM as a BI "megavendor" (along with Oracle, Microsoft, and SAP). This consolidation may prove beneficial for customers to have fewer vendors to deal with, but this raises concerns about integration of the software as more vendors are bought out by the big four. Another challenge is maintaining the same level of customer service. Gartner interprets the lower ratings given in "customer experience" for IBM Cognos and SAP Business Objects as a result of post-acquisition issues. Due to many consolidations in the BI industry, there are only a few independent "pure-play" vendors remaining (SAS and MicroStrategy being the largest).

== Products ==
On October 26, 2015, at the IBM Insight conference in Las Vegas, IBM leadership announced a redesigned user experience for its flagship Cognos Business Intelligence software. The redesign will be version 11 and an upgrade from Cognos Business Intelligence 10.x. The differentiation in the version 11 release also required renaming to IBM Cognos Analytics, based on the same self-service design principles as Watson Analytics. The redesigned Cognos product also features smarter search that works in-context.

On October 25, 2010, at the Business Analytics Forum in Las Vegas, IBM general manager for business analytics and former Cognos CEO Rob Ashe announced IBM Cognos 10. A significant upgrade to IBM Cognos 8 BI, this new software brings together social collaboration and analytics for business users to gain real-time intelligence in a single, user-friendly interface — online or through mobile devices such as iPad, iPhone and BlackBerry devices.

IBM Cognos 8 BI, initially launched in September 2005, combined the features of several previous products, including ReportNet, PowerPlay, Metrics Manager, NoticeCast, and DecisionStream. There are also Express and Extended versions of Cognos 8 BI. Full features:

- Report Studio (Professional report authoring tool formatted for the web)
- Query Studio (Ad hoc report authoring tool with instant data preview)
- Analysis Studio (Explore multidimensional cube data to answer business questions)
- Metric Studio (Monitor, analyze, and report on KPIs)
- Metric Designer (Define, load, and maintain metrics to be available in Metric Studio)
- Event Studio (Action-based agents to notify decision makers as events happen)
- Framework Manager (Semantic metadata layer tool which creates models or packages)
- PowerPlay Studio (formerly PowerPlay Web)
- Analytic Applications (Packaged BI Applications, built on an adaptable platform and extensible into Business Analytics)

IBM Cognos Express, launched in September 2009, is an integrated business intelligence and planning solution purpose-built to meet the needs of midsize companies. The features of Express are:

- Cognos Express Reporter (Self-service reporting and ad hoc query)
- Cognos Express Advisor (Freeform analysis and visualization)
- Cognos Express Xcelerator (TM1-based planning and business analysis, with Microsoft Excel and web interfaces)

IBM Cognos also offered several application development tools (which IBM later sold to UNICOM Global):

- IBM Cognos PowerHouse 4GL
- IBM Cognos PowerHouse Web
- IBM Cognos Axiant 4GL

IBM Cognos Analytics also currently offers a free trial
