= David Harel =

Israeli computer scientist

David Harel FRS
- דוד הראל
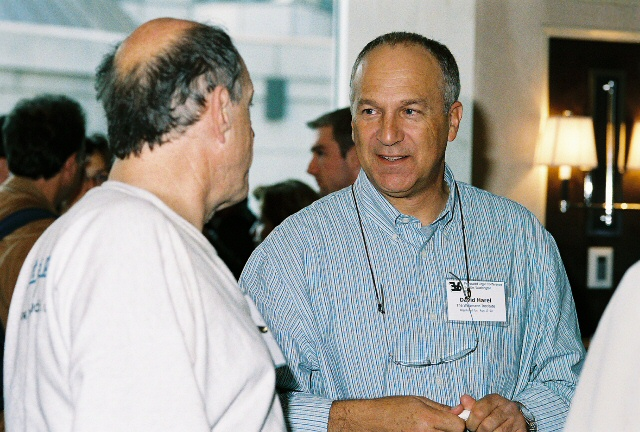
- David Harel (right) with Carl Hewitt at FLoC 2006
- Born: 12 April 1950 (age 76); London, England, UK
- Citizenship: Israel and United Kingdom
- Awards: ACM Software System Award; Israel Prize
- Scientific career
- Fields: Computer science
- Workplaces: Weizmann Institute
- Thesis: Logics of Programs: Axiomatics and Descriptive Power (1978)
- Doctoral advisor: Vaughan Pratt
- Doctoral students: David Peleg

David Harel (Hebrew: דוד הראל; born 12 April 1950) is a computer scientist, currently serving as President of the Israel Academy of Sciences and Humanities. He has been on the faculty of the Weizmann Institute of Science in Israel since 1980, and holds the William Sussman Professorial Chair of Mathematics. Born in London, England, he was Dean of the Faculty of Mathematics and Computer Science at the institute for seven years.

== Biography ==
Harel is best known for his work on dynamic logic, computability, database theory, software engineering and modelling biological systems. In the 1980s he invented the graphical language of Statecharts for specifying and programming reactive systems, which has been adopted as part of the UML standard. Since the late 1990s he has concentrated on a scenario-based approach to programming such systems, launched by his co-invention (with W. Damm) of Live Sequence Charts. He has published expository accounts of computer science, such as his award-winning 1987 book "Algorithmics: The Spirit of Computing" and his 2000 book "Computers Ltd.: What They Really Can’t do", and has presented series on computer science for Israeli radio and television. He has also worked on other diverse topics, such as graph layout, computer science education, biological modeling and the analysis and communication of odors.

Harel completed his PhD at MIT between 1976 and 1978. In 1987, he co-founded the software company I-Logix, which in 2006 became part of IBM. He has advocated building a full computer model of the Caenorhabditis elegans nematode, which was the first multicellular organism to have its genome completely sequenced. The eventual completeness of such a model depends on his updated version of the Turing test. He is a fellow of the ACM, the IEEE, the AAAS, and the EATCS, and a member of several international academies. Harel is active in a number of peace and human rights organizations in Israel.

== Awards and honors ==
Diagram showing how Harel's Statecharts contributed to object-oriented methods and notation

- 1986 Stevens Award for Software Development Methods
- 1992 ACM Karlstrom Outstanding Educator Award
- 1994 ACM Fellow
- 1995 IEEE Fellow
- 2004 Israel Prize, for computer science
- 2005 Doctor Honoris Causa, University of Rennes, France
- 2006 ACM SIGSOFT Outstanding Research Award
- 2006 Member of the Academia Europaea
- 2006 Doctor (Laura) Honoris Causa, University of Milano-Bicocca, 18 May 2006
- 2006 Fellow Honoris Causa, Open University of Israel
- 2007 ACM Software System Award
- 2010 Emet Prize
- 2010 Member of the Israel Academy of Sciences and Humanities
- 2012 Doctor Honoris Causa, Eindhoven University of Technology, The Netherlands
- 2014 International Member of the US National Academy of Engineering
- 2014 International Honorary Member of the American Academy of Arts and Sciences
- 2019 International Member of the US National Academy of Sciences.
- 2020 Fellow of the Royal Society (FRS)
- 2021 Foreign Member of the Chinese Academy of Sciences
- 2023 Harlan D. Mills Award

== See also ==
- List of Israel Prize recipients
- Members of the Israel Academy of Sciences and Humanities
