= DOORS =

Requirements management tool

IBM Engineering Requirements Management DOORS
- Developer: IBM
- Stable release: 9.7.2.12 / 2026-06-30
- Operating system: Linux, Windows
- Available in: Brazilian Portuguese, Simplified Chinese, Traditional Chinese, French, German, Italian, Japanese, Korean, Russian, Spanish, Turkish and English.
- Type: Requirements management
- Website: https://www.ibm.com/products/requirements-management

IBM Engineering Requirements Management DOORS (Dynamic Object Oriented Requirements System) (formerly Telelogic DOORS, then Rational DOORS) is a requirements management tool. It is a client–server application, with a Windows-only client and servers for Linux, Windows, and Solaris. There is also a web client, DOORS Web Access.

IBM Engineering Requirements Management DOORS Family has its own programming language called DOORS eXtension Language (DXL).

IBM Engineering Requirements Management DOORS Next is now developed on the IBM Jazz platform. The Jazz platform uses Open Services for Lifecycle Collaboration (OSLC).

In order to complete its functionality, IBM Engineering Requirements Management DOORS Next has an open architecture that supports third-party plugins.

DOORS was originally published by Quality Systems and Software Ltd (QSS) in 1991. Telelogic acquired QSS in mid-2000 and IBM acquired Telelogic in 2008.

== History ==
DOORS was created by Dr Richard Stevens, a researcher through the 1970s and 1980s at the European Space Agency's Research Institute (ESRIN). The first version was provided to the UK Ministry of Defence in 1991–92. The first commercial version was released in 1993.

== Features ==
DOORS is designed to ease the requirements management process with a variety of features:

- The requirements database can be accessed with a web browser through DOORS Web Access.
- Changes to requirements can be managed with either a simple predefined change proposal system or a more thorough, customizable change control workflow through integration to IBM change management solutions.
- With the Requirements Interchange Format, suppliers and development partners can be directly involved in the development process.
- Requirements to design items, test plans, test cases, and other requirements can be linked for easy and powerful traceability.
- Business users, marketing, suppliers, systems engineers, and business analysts can collaborate directly through requirements discussions.
- Testers can link requirements to test cases using the Test Tracking Toolkit for manual test environments.
- Open Services for Lifecycle Collaboration (OSLC) can be used for specifications for requirements management, change management, and quality management to integrate with systems and software lifecycle tools.
- Can be integrated with other IBM tools, including IBM Engineering Workflow Management, IBM Engineering Test Management, IBM Engineering Systems Design Rhapsody, Jazz™ Reporting Service, and also many third-party tools, providing a comprehensive traceability solution.

== See also ==
- IBM Engineering Systems Design Rhapsody
- List of requirements engineering tools
- Open Services for Lifecycle Collaboration
