= Dan Linstedt =

Daniel Linstedt is an American data architect and inventor of the data modeling method data vault for data warehouses and business intelligence. He developed the model in the 1990s and published the first version in the early 2000s. In 2012, Data Vault 2.0 was announced and it was released in 2013. In addition to data modeling, the data vault method incorporates process design, database tuning and performance improvements for ETL/ELT, Capability Maturity Model Integration (CMMI) and agile software development.

Dan holds a Bachelor of Science in computer science from California State University, Chico. Since 2020, he has been the chief executive officer (CEO) of DataVaultAlliance Holdings LLC.

== Selected works ==
- The Business of Data Vault Modeling (2010-11-19) by author Daniel Linstedt and co-authors Kent Graziano and Hans Hultgren ISBN 1-4357-1914-X
- Super Charge Your Data Warehouse: Invaluable Data Modeling Rules to Implement Your Data Vault (Data Warehouse Architecture Book 1) (2012-05-20) by Dan Linstedt and Kent Graziano ISBN 1-4637-7868-6
- Building a Scalable Data Warehouse with Data Vault 2.0 (2015-09-15) by Daniel Linstedt and Michael Olschimke ISBN 978-0-12-802510-9

== See also ==
- Data architecture
- Enterprise architecture
