= Data management platform =

Software platform for collecting and managing data

A data management platform (DMP) is a software platform used for collecting and managing data. DMPs allow businesses to identify audience segments, which can be used to target specific users and contexts in online advertising campaigns. They may use big data and artificial intelligence algorithms to process and analyze large data sets about users from various sources. Advantages of using DMPs include data organization, increased insight on audiences and markets, and more effective advertisement budgeting. On the other hand, DMPs often have to deal with privacy concerns due to the integration of third-party software with private data. This technology is continuously being developed by global entities such as Nielsen and Oracle.

More generally, the term data platform can refer to any software platform used for collecting and managing data. It is an integrated solution which as of the 2010s can combine functionalities of for example a data lake, data warehouse or data hub for business intelligence purposes. However, this article discusses the use such technology platforms used for collecting and managing data for digital marketing purposes specifically.

== Characteristics ==
=== Purpose ===
A DMP is any kind of software that manages the gathering, storage, and organization of data so that useful information can be leveraged from it by marketers, publishers, and other businesses. The data stored may include customer information, demographics, and mobile identifiers or cookie IDs, which the DMP will analyze to allow businesses to create targeting segments for advertisements. DMPs can help brands learn more about their customer segments to inform acquisitions strategies and increase their sales. They also allow businesses to gauge the effectiveness of their advertising campaigns.

=== History ===
==== First and second generation programming languages ====
During the 1950s, data management became a problem for companies as computers were not quick with computations and needed a great amount of labor to deliver results. Companies started by storing their data in warehouses. Early programs were written in binary and decimal and this was known as absolute machine language, which later was called the first generation programming language.

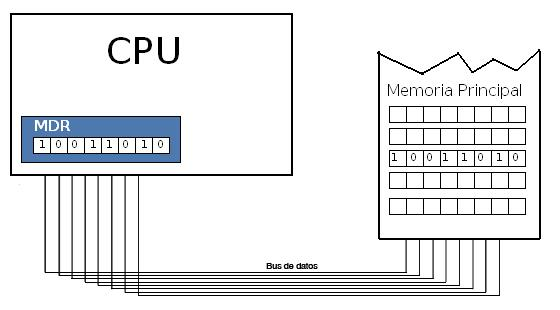
An example of how data was stored in the early days of data management

After this, assembly language - which came to be known as second generation programming languages - came into existence. This symbolic machine code grew popular among programmers as they were able to utilize alphabet letters for coding. This led to less errors in programs and improved code readability.

==== High-level languages ====
Throughout the 1960s and 1970s, as technology continued to progress and programmers became more in touch with computers, the First and Second Generation Programming Languages evolved into high-level languages (HLL). These languages are known for being easily readable by a human and were important for allowing one to write a generic program that does not depend on the kind of computer used. HLL were known for emphasizing memory and data management and many of the languages that came out in this era (i.e. COBOL, C, and C++) are still widely used today.

==== Online data management and databases ====
Online transactions soon were a big part of many industries. This was made possible by online data management systems. These systems can analyze information quickly and they allow programs to read, update and send information to the user.

In the 1970s, Edgar F. Codd developed an easy-to-learn language, Structured Query Language (SQL) that had English commands. This language dealt with relational databases, improved data processing and decreased duplicated data. This relational model allowed large amounts of data to be processed quickly and improved parallel processing, client-server computing, and graphical user interfaces and it made multiple users to interact simultaneously.

To deal with the processing and research of Big Data, NoSQL came into existence. NoSQL's greatest power is its ability to store vast amounts of data. NoSQL was present in 1998, however its popularity among developers grew after 2005.

==== Cloud and artificial intelligence ====
Nowadays, data management has transferred over from local storage to the cloud. In the late 1990s and early 2000s, Salesforce and Amazon popularized the concept of internet-based services, which appealed to customers as it reduced in-house maintenance costs and increased flexibility in changing the needs of a business. With the rising prevalence of artificial intelligence (AI), it is now easier than ever to store and sort through immense sets of data. It is in this era that DMPs have experienced their rise to prominence as the astronomical amount of user data in the world can now be processed and presented to companies for marketing purposes.

== Data pipeline ==
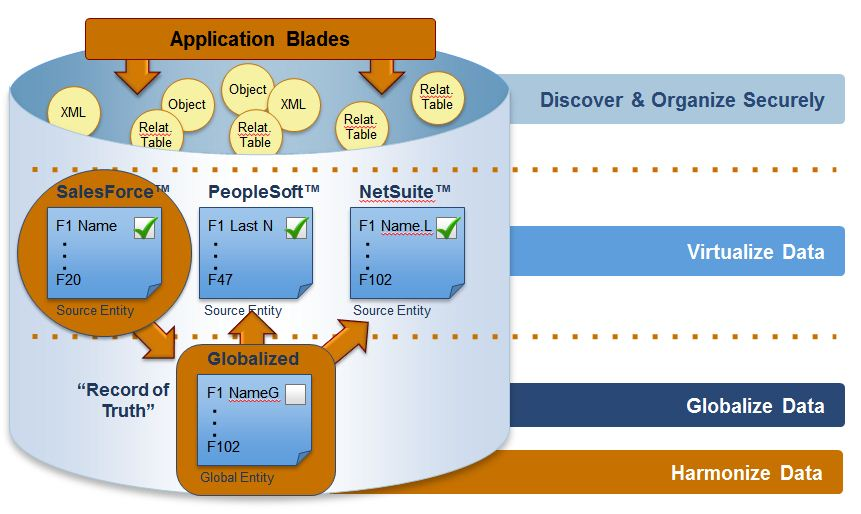
An overview of how data is processed through a DMP

DMPs first begin by gathering raw data. This requires data collection from various sources such as webpage visits and registration forms found online. Moreover, the available data is not limited to one's computer, as mobile devices, social networks, and smart devices all act as constant sources of raw data. From a technical standpoint, JavaScript trackers and APIs are used to inform the server when the user is performing an action that should be recorded and stored.

Once the DMP has collected the data, it moves on to then process and integrate all of it. It first cleans the data by filtering out any junk or missing values. Then, it utilizes machine learning algorithms to find patterns across sets of users and organize them on a broad scale. This helps create a 360 degree customer view which in turn helps to integrate first-, second-, and third-party data types into one database.

Next comes the data management phase. Here, the DMP assists its clients - which are other companies seeking to leverage their user data - in creating user profiles. User profiles are segments of specific customer demographics that are intended to help visualize patterns and tendencies across an industry. They are also useful for shedding light on undiscovered market opportunities.

The final step in this process is the activation stage. Once all the data has been gathered, processed, and properly organized and segmented, it is put into use in the marketplace through servers or DSPs. From here, advertisers uses other third-party services to access a DMP and provide targeted content to their intended audiences.

== Functionalities ==
DMPs are used for profiling, analyzing, and targeting online customers in digital marketing. They work in the following areas:

- Ad targeting – creating audience segments and targeting specific users with personalized ad campaigns, such as displaying advertisements for cars to users who demonstrate interest in buying a new car.
- User profiling – representing real people using sets of data on user related information, such as needs, interests, and behaviors. Profiles can be created manually or through machine learning algorithms that automatically analyze and profile internet users.
- Look-alike modeling – identifying new clients who behave similarly to current customers for targeted ad campaigns.
- Business insights – discovering new insights about customers and services through data analysis, as well as supplementing existing CRM systems with additional external data, such as users’ attributes or their interactions with online products.
- Content and product recommendations – using DMP recommendations to develop a personalized experience for all users.
- Monetizing or selling data – selling DMP data to generate additional revenue.
- Audience enrichment – analyzing and getting to know an audience through DMP analytics to know their specific needs.
- Grow your customer base – discovering a new customer segment with DMP analytics and growing awareness and brand loyalty.

== Advantages and disadvantages ==
=== Advantages ===
There are six major advantages to using a data management platform: gathering data in one place, using third party data to discover new markets, gaining audience insights, creating a full view of customers, targeting your audience, and effectively budgeting your expenditures on marketing.

=== Disadvantages ===
Data management platforms rely heavily on Cookie technology to identify behaviours. Recent moves from Apple and now Google are moving towards blocking third party advertising cookies which places the Data management platform value proposition at risk.

Moreover, the adoption of such a platform may be difficult in an organization's current environment. This is because data aggregation technology is complex and requires the correct technical knowledge for implementation.

Another area of concern is the quality of the imported data: if it is of low quality, then the DMP will fail to provide meaningful results.

== Ownership of collected data and privacy concerns ==
There are three main types of data in general:

- 1st party data – data collected and owned by the company itself. For example, website data, mobile application data, and CRM data.
- 2nd party data – data collected as a result of corporate cooperation. This includes online campaign data and customer journey data.
- 3rd party data – data delivered by data providers, which is available on the market for purchase.

There are also three main types of data collected by DMPs:

- Observed data – the digital footprint of internet users, i.e. search history or type of web browser used.
- Inferred data – conclusions based on a user's internet behavior.
- Declared data – data explicitly provided from users such as online forms or application sign ups.

DMPs are beneficial in helping digital marketers discover new audiences based on third-party data. Although this is the case, the General Data Protection Regulation (GDPR) makes it harder for DMPs to obtain third-party data. Previously, DMPs processed third-party data through cookies and existing laws did not require user consent for such data collection. However, the GDPR now demands that personal data - which includes data collected through the use of cookies - can only be used with user consent. Going forward, this means that collecting third-party data will become harder for companies, and DMPs will have greater legal obligations. As a result, future DMPs may rely more heavily on first-party and second-party data.
