= Joe Caserta =

American information specialist, author

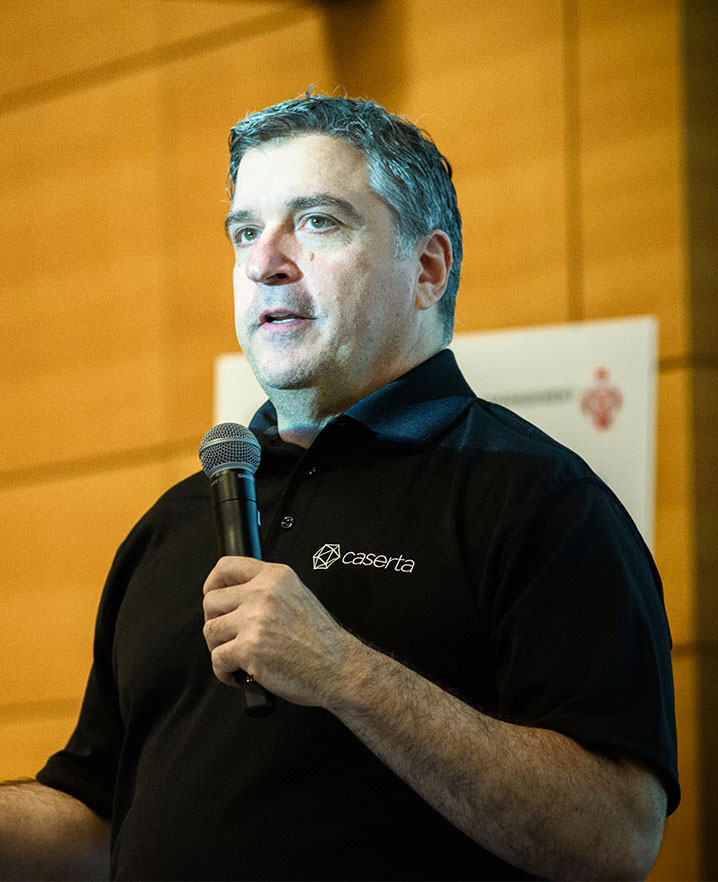
- Joe Caserta at MIT CDOIQ Data Symposium, July 18, 2018
- Born: New York, NY, USA
- Education: Columbia University
- Employer: Caserta
- Title: Founder and President

Joe Caserta is an American information specialist and author. He is best known as the founder and president of data and analytics consulting, architecture, and implementation firm Caserta founded in 2001. Management consulting firm McKinsey & Company acquired Caserta on June 1, 2022.

Joe Caserta was born and raised in New York. He studied database application development and design at Columbia University. He is a data science expert, keynote speaker, and panelist.

Working with Ralph Kimball, he co-authored The Data Warehouse ETL Toolkit, (Wiley, 2004) which is used as a textbook for courses teaching ETL processes in data warehousing.

Caserta is the founder and host of the Big Data Warehousing Meetup group in New York, which has more than 5,000 members.
