= Transactional database =

Transactional database may refer to:

- Operational database of customer transactions
- Database transaction - a transactional database could be one that is ACID-compliant for each database transaction
- Navigational database
