= Operational system =

An operational system is a term used in data warehousing to refer to a system that is used to process the day-to-day transactions of an organization. These systems are designed in a manner that processing of day-to-day transactions is performed efficiently and the integrity of the transactional data is preserved.

== Synonyms ==
Sometimes operational systems are referred to as operational databases, transaction processing systems, or online transaction processing systems (OLTP). However, the use of the last two terms as synonyms may be confusing, because operational systems can be batch processing systems as well.

Any enterprise must necessarily maintain a lot of data about its operation.

Organization	Probably
Manufacturing Company	Product data
Bank	Account Data
Hospital	Patient Data
University	Student Data
Government Department	Planning data

== See also ==
- Data warehouses versus operational systems
- Operating system (OS)
- Operational data store, a database used for operational reporting, and as a source of data for a data warehouse
