= Data hub =

Center of data exchange

A data hub is a center of data exchange that is supported by data science, data engineering, and data warehouse technologies to interact with endpoints such as applications and algorithms.

== Features ==
A data hub differs from a data warehouse in that it is generally unintegrated and often at different grains. It differs from an operational data store because a data hub does not need to be limited to operational data.

A data hub differs from a data lake by homogenizing data and possibly serving data in multiple desired formats, rather than simply storing it in one place, and by adding other value to the data such as de-duplication, quality, security, and a standardized set of query services. A data lake tends to store data in one place for availability, and allow/require the consumer to process or add value to the data.

Data hubs are ideally the "go-to" place for data within an enterprise, so that many point-to-point connections between callers and data suppliers do not need to be made, and so that the data hub organization can negotiate deliverables and schedules with various data enclave teams, rather than being an organizational free-for-all as different teams try to get new services and features from many other teams.
