= Data mart =

Data management pattern

Data warehouse and data mart overview, with data marts shown in the top right.

A data mart is a structure/access pattern specific to data warehouse environments. The data mart is a subset of the data warehouse that focuses on a specific business line, department, subject area, or team. Whereas data warehouses have an enterprise-wide depth, the information in data marts pertains to a single department. In some deployments, each department or business unit is considered the owner of its data mart, including all the hardware, software, and data. This enables each department to isolate the use, manipulation, and development of its data. In other deployments where conformed dimensions are used, this business unit ownership will not hold true for shared dimensions like customer, product, etc.

Warehouses and data marts are built because the information in the database is not organized in a way that makes it readily accessible. This organization requires queries that are too complicated, difficult to access, or resource-intensive.

While transactional databases are designed to be updated, data warehouses or marts are read-only. Data warehouses are designed to access large groups of related records. Data marts improve end-user response time by allowing users to have access to the specific type of data they need to view most often, by providing the data in a way that supports the collective view of a group of users.

A data mart is basically a condensed and more focused version of a data warehouse that reflects the regulations and process specifications of each business unit within an organization. Each data mart is dedicated to a specific business function or region. This subset of data may span across many or all of an enterprise's functional subject areas. It is common for multiple data marts to be used in order to serve the needs of each individual business unit (different data marts can be used to obtain specific information for various enterprise departments, such as accounting, marketing, sales, etc.).

The related term spreadmart is a pejorative describing the situation that occurs when one or more business analysts develop a system of linked spreadsheets to perform a business analysis, then grow it to a size and degree of complexity that makes it nearly impossible to maintain.

== Data mart vs data warehouse ==
=== Data mart ===
- Scope. Department- or subject-specific subset designed to meet the analytics needs of a line of business (e.g., Sales, Finance, Marketing).
- Level of detail. May contain detailed or aggregated data restricted to the subject area.
- Sourcing. Can be dependent (sourced from the enterprise data warehouse) or independent (sourced directly from operational/external systems).
- Modeling. Commonly implemented as a dimensional model (star schema) for ease of use in analytics.

=== Data warehouse ===
- Scope. Enterprise-wide repository integrating data across multiple subject areas to support decision-making.
- Characteristics. Subject-oriented, integrated, time-variant and non-volatile; typically stores detailed historical data and feeds dimensional models for analytics.
- Integration. Provides consistency across processes via shared, conformed dimensions in a bus architecture when implementing dimensional models.

=== Relationship ===
- A data warehouse offers an organization-wide, integrated foundation, while data marts provide focused delivery for specific teams. In the Kimball approach, conformed dimensions align marts so they can be combined consistently across processes.

== Dependent data mart ==
According to the Inmon school of data warehousing, a dependent data mart is a logical subset (view) or a physical subset (extract) of a larger data warehouse, isolated for one of the following reasons:

- A need for refreshment of a special data model or schema: e.g., to restructure for OLAP.
- Performance: to offload the data mart to a separate computer for greater efficiency or to eliminate the need to manage that workload on the centralized data warehouse.
- Security: to separate an authorized data subset selectively.
- Expediency: to bypass the data governance and authorizations required to incorporate a new application on the Enterprise Data Warehouse.
- Proving ground: to demonstrate the viability and ROI (return on investment) potential of an application prior to migrating it to the Enterprise Data Warehouse.

According to the Inmon school of data warehousing, tradeoffs inherent with data marts include limited scalability, duplication of data, data inconsistency with other silos of information, and inability to leverage enterprise sources of data.

The alternative school of data warehousing is that of Ralph Kimball. In his view, a data warehouse is nothing more than the union of all the data marts. This view helps to reduce costs and provides fast development, but can create an inconsistent data warehouse, especially in large organizations. Therefore, Kimball's approach is more suitable for small-to-medium corporations.

== See also ==
- Data warehouse
- Enterprise architecture
- OLAP cube
- OSSIE
