= Data architect =

Person who works in data architecture

A data architect is a practitioner of data architecture, a data management discipline concerned with designing, creating, deploying and managing an organization's data architecture. Data architects define how the data will be stored, consumed, integrated and managed by different data entities and IT systems, as well as any applications using or processing that data in some way. It is closely allied with business architecture and is considered to be one of the four domains of enterprise architecture.

== Role ==
According to the Data Management Body of Knowledge, the data architect “provides a standard common business vocabulary, expresses strategic data requirements, outlines high level integrated designs to meet these requirements, and aligns with enterprise strategy and related business architecture.”

According to the Open Group Architecture Framework (TOGAF), a data architect is expected to set data architecture principles, create models of data that enable the implementation of the intended business architecture, create diagrams showing key data entities, and create an inventory of the data needed to implement the architecture vision.

== Responsibilities ==
- Organizes data at the macro level.
- Organizes data at the micro level, data models, for a new application.
- Provides a logical data model as a standard for the golden source and for consuming applications to inherit.
- Provides a logical data model with elements and business rules needed for the creation of data quality (DQ) rules.

== Skills ==
Bob Lambert describes the necessary skills of a data architect as follows:

- Foundation in systems development: the data architect should understand the system development life cycle; software project management approaches; and requirements, design, and test techniques. The data architect is asked to conceptualize and influence application and interface projects, and therefore must understand what advice to give and where to plug in to steer toward desirable outcomes.
- Depth in data modeling and database design: This is the core skill of the data architect, and the most requested in data architect job descriptions. The effective data architect is sound across all phases of data modeling, from conceptualization to database optimization. In his/her experience this skill extends to SQL development and perhaps database administration.
- Breadth in established and emerging data technologies: In addition to depth in established data management and reporting technologies, the data architect is either experienced or conversant in emerging tools like columnar and NoSQL databases, predictive analytics, data visualization, and unstructured data. While not necessarily deep in all of these technologies, the data architect hopefully is experienced in one or more, and must understand them sufficiently to guide the organization in understanding and adopting them.
- Ability to conceive and portray the "big picture": When the data architect initiates, evaluates, and influences projects he or she does so from the perspective of the entire organization. The data architect maps the systems and interfaces used to manage data, sets standards for data management, analyzes current state and conceives desired future state, and conceives projects needed to close the gap between current state and future goals.
- Ability to astutely operate in the organization: Five key characteristics, which point to the data architect’s ability to operate politically in the organization:
  - Well respected and influential
  - Able to emphasize methodology, modeling, and governance
  - Technologically and politically neutral
  - Articulate, persuasive, and a good salesperson
  - Enthusiastic

== See also ==
- Data architecture
- Information architect
- Enterprise architecture
