= Bill Inmon =

American computer scientist

William H. Inmon (born 1945) is an American computer scientist, recognized by many as the father of the data warehouse. Inmon wrote the first book, held the first conference (with Arnie Barnett), wrote the first column in a magazine and was the first to offer classes in data warehousing. Inmon created the accepted definition of what a data warehouse is - a subject-oriented, non-volatile, integrated, time-variant collection of data in support of management's decisions. Compared with the approach of the other pioneering architect of data warehousing, Ralph Kimball, Inmon's approach is often characterized as a top-down approach.

== Biography ==
William H. Inmon was born July 20, 1945, in San Diego, California. He received his Bachelor of Science degree in mathematics from Yale University in 1967, and his Master of Science degree in computer science from New Mexico State University.

He worked for American Management Systems and Coopers & Lybrand before 1991, when he founded the company Prism Solutions, which he took public. In 1995 he founded Pine Cone Systems, which was renamed Ambeo later on. In 1999, he created a corporate information factory web site for his consulting business.

Inmon coined terms such as the government information factory, as well as data warehousing 2.0. Inmon promotes building, usage, and maintenance of data warehouses and related topics. His books include "Building the Data Warehouse" (1992, with later editions) and "DW 2.0: The Architecture for the Next Generation of Data Warehousing" (2008).

On July 9, 2007, Inmon was named by Computerworld as one of the "Ten People In IT Who Mattered Over The Past 40 Years (But You May Not Know Why)". The magazine cited his coining of the term "data warehouse" in 1990 and his status as the father of the "$28 billion industry"

Inmon's association with data warehousing stems from the fact that he wrote the first book on data warehousing, he held the first conference on data warehousing (with Arnie Barnett), he wrote the first column in a magazine on data warehousing, he has written over 1,000 articles on data warehousing in journals and newsletters, he created the first fold out wall chart for data warehousing and he conducted the first classes on data warehousing.

In 2012, Inmon developed and made public technology known as "textual disambiguation". Textual disambiguation applies context to raw text and reformats the raw text and context into a standard data base format. Once raw text is passed through textual disambiguation, it can easily and efficiently be accessed and analyzed by standard business intelligence technology. Textual disambiguation is accomplished through the execution of TextualETL.

Inmon owns and operates Forest Rim Technology, a company that applies and implements data warehousing solutions executed through textual disambiguation and TextualETL.

== Awards ==
- (2002) DAMA International Professional Achievement Award for, "major contributions as the 'father of data warehousing' and a recognized thought leader in decision support" from DAMA International, The Global Data Management Community.
- (2018) Received a Lifetime Achievement Award from Data Modelling Zone.
- (December 2020) Received a Lifetime Achievement Award from Project Management Institute (PMI).

== Publications ==
Bill Inmon has published more than 70 books in nine languages and 2,000 articles on data warehousing and data management.

- Effective Data Base Design, Prentice-Hall, 1981, ISBN 9780132414890
- Inmon, William H.; Bird, Thomas J. (1986), The Dynamics of Data Base, Prentice-Hall, ISBN 9780132214742
- Information Engineering For The Practitioner : Putting Theory into Practice, Prentice-Hall, 1988, ISBN 9780134645797
- Information Systems Architecture, Development in the 90's, QED Pub. Group, 1992, ISBN 978-0894354106
- Building the Data Warehouse, Wiley, 1992, ISBN 9780764599446
- Inmon, William H.; Kelley, Chuck (1993), Rdb/VMS: Developing the Data Warehouse, QED Pub. Group, ISBN 9780894354298
- Inmon, William H.; Imhoff Claudia; Battas, Greg (1996) Building the Operational Data Store, Wiley, ISBN 0-471-12822-8
- Inmon, William H.; Imhoff, Claudia; Sousa, Ryan (1998), Corporate Information Factory, Wiley, ISBN 978-0471399612
- Inmon, William H.; Terdeman, R. H.; Imhoff, Claudia (2000), Exploration Warehousing: Turning Business Information into Business Opportunity, Wiley, ISBN 978-0471374732
- Inmon, William H.; Oneil, Bonnie; Fryman, Lowell (2007), Business Metadata: Capturing Enterprise Knowledge, Elsevier Press, ISBN 978-0123737267
- Inmon, William H.; Nesavich, Tony (2007), Tapping Into Unstructured Data: Integrating Unstructured Data and Textual Analytics Into Business Intelligence, Prentice-Hall, ISBN 978-0132360296
- Inmon, William H.; Strauss, Derek; Neushloss, Genia (2008), DW 2.0: The Architecture for the Next Generation of Data Warehousing (Morgan Kaufman Series in Data Management Systems), Elsevier Press, ISBN 978-0123743190
- Inmon, William H.; Linstedt, Daniel; Levins, Mary (2014), Data Architecture: A Primer for the Data Scientist, Academic Press, ISBN 978-0128169162
- Brestoff, Nelson E.; Inmon, William H. (2015), Preventing Litigation: An Early Warning System to Get Big Value Out of Big Data, Business Expert Press, ISBN 978-1631573156
- Data Lake Architecture: Designing the Data Lake and Avoiding the Garbage Dump, Technics Publications, 2016, ASIN B01DPEGSO4
- Turning Text into Gold: Taxonomies and Textual Analytics, Technics Publications, 2017, ASIN B01N7OK2SZ
- Turning Spreadsheets into Corporate Data, Technics Publications, 2017, ISBN 978-1634622288
- Hearing the Voice of the Customer, Technics Publications, 2018, ISBN 978-1634623315
- Inmon, William H.; Puppini, Francesco (2020), The Unified Star Schema: An Agile and Resilient Approach to Data Warehouse and Analytics Design, Technics Publications, ISBN 978-1634628877
- Inmon, William H.; Srivastava, Ranjeet (2020), The Textual Warehous, Technics Publications, ISBN 978-1634629546
- Inmon, William H.; Levins, Mary; Srivastava, Ranjeet (2021), Building the Data Lakehouse, Technics Publications, ISBN 978-1634629669

== See also ==
- Single version of the truth
- The Kimball lifecycle, a high-level sequence of tasks used to design, develop and deploy a data warehouse or business intelligence system
