= Ralph Kimball =

American computer scientist

Ralph Kimball (born July 18, 1944) is an author on the subject of data warehousing and business intelligence. He is one of the original architects of data warehousing and is known for long-term convictions that data warehouses must be designed to be understandable and fast. His bottom-up methodology, also known as dimensional modeling or the Kimball methodology, is one of the two main data warehousing methodologies alongside Bill Inmon.

He is the principal author of the best-selling books The Data Warehouse Toolkit (1996), The Data Warehouse Lifecycle Toolkit (1998), The Data Warehouse ETL Toolkit (2004) and The Kimball Group Reader (2015), published by Wiley and Sons.

== Career ==
After receiving a Ph.D. in 1973 from Stanford University in electrical engineering (specializing in man-machine systems), Ralph joined the Xerox Palo Alto Research Center (PARC). At PARC Ralph was a principal designer of the Xerox Star Workstation, the first commercial product to use mice, icons and windows.

Inspired by Gabe Pierce, Kimball then became vice president of applications at Metaphor Computer Systems, a decision support software and services provider. He developed the Capsule Facility in 1982. The Capsule was a graphical programming technique which connected icons together in a logical flow, allowing a very visual style of programming for non-programmers. The Capsule was used to build reporting and analysis applications at Metaphor.

Kimball founded Red Brick Systems in 1986, and was CEO until 1992. The company was acquired by Informix, which is now owned by IBM. Red Brick was known for its relational database optimized for data warehousing. Their claim to fame was the use of bit-map Indexes in order to achieve performance gains that amounted to almost 10 times that of other database vendors at that time.

Since 1992, Kimball has provided data warehouse consulting and education through various companies such as Ralph Kimball Associates and the Kimball Group.

== See also ==
- Single version of the truth
- The Kimball lifecycle, a high-level sequence tasks used to design, develop and deploy a data warehouse or business intelligence system

== Bibliography ==
- Kimball, Ralph; Margy Ross (2013). The Data Warehouse Toolkit: The Definitive Guide to Dimensional Modeling (3rd ed.). Wiley. ISBN 978-1-118-53080-1.
- Kimball, Ralph; Margy Ross (2010). The Kimball Group Reader. Wiley. ISBN 978-0-470-56310-6.
- Kimball, Ralph; Margy Ross; Warren Thornthwaite; Joy Mundy; Bob Becker (2008). The Data Warehouse Lifecycle Toolkit (2nd ed.). Wiley. ISBN 978-0-470-14977-5.
- Kimball, Ralph; Joe Caserta (2004). The Data Warehouse ETL Toolkit. Wiley. ISBN 0-7645-6757-8.
- Kimball, Ralph; Margy Ross (2002). The Data Warehouse Toolkit: The Complete Guide to Dimensional Modeling (2nd ed.). Wiley. ISBN 0-471-20024-7.
- Kimball, Ralph; Richard Merz (2000). The Data Webhouse Toolkit: Building the Web-Enabled Data Warehouse. Wiley. ISBN 0-471-37680-9.
- Kimball, Ralph; et al. (1998). The Data Warehouse Lifecycle Toolkit. Wiley. ISBN 0-471-25547-5.
- Kimball, Ralph (1996). The Data Warehouse Toolkit. Wiley. ISBN 978-0-471-15337-5.
