= Homogamy =

Homogamy may refer to:

- Homogamy (biology), a term used in biology in 4 separate senses
- Homogamy (sociology), marriage between individuals who are, in some culturally important way, similar to each other

== See also ==
- Cleistogamy
- Endogamy
- Heterogamy
- Isogamy
- Self-fertilization
- Self-pollination
