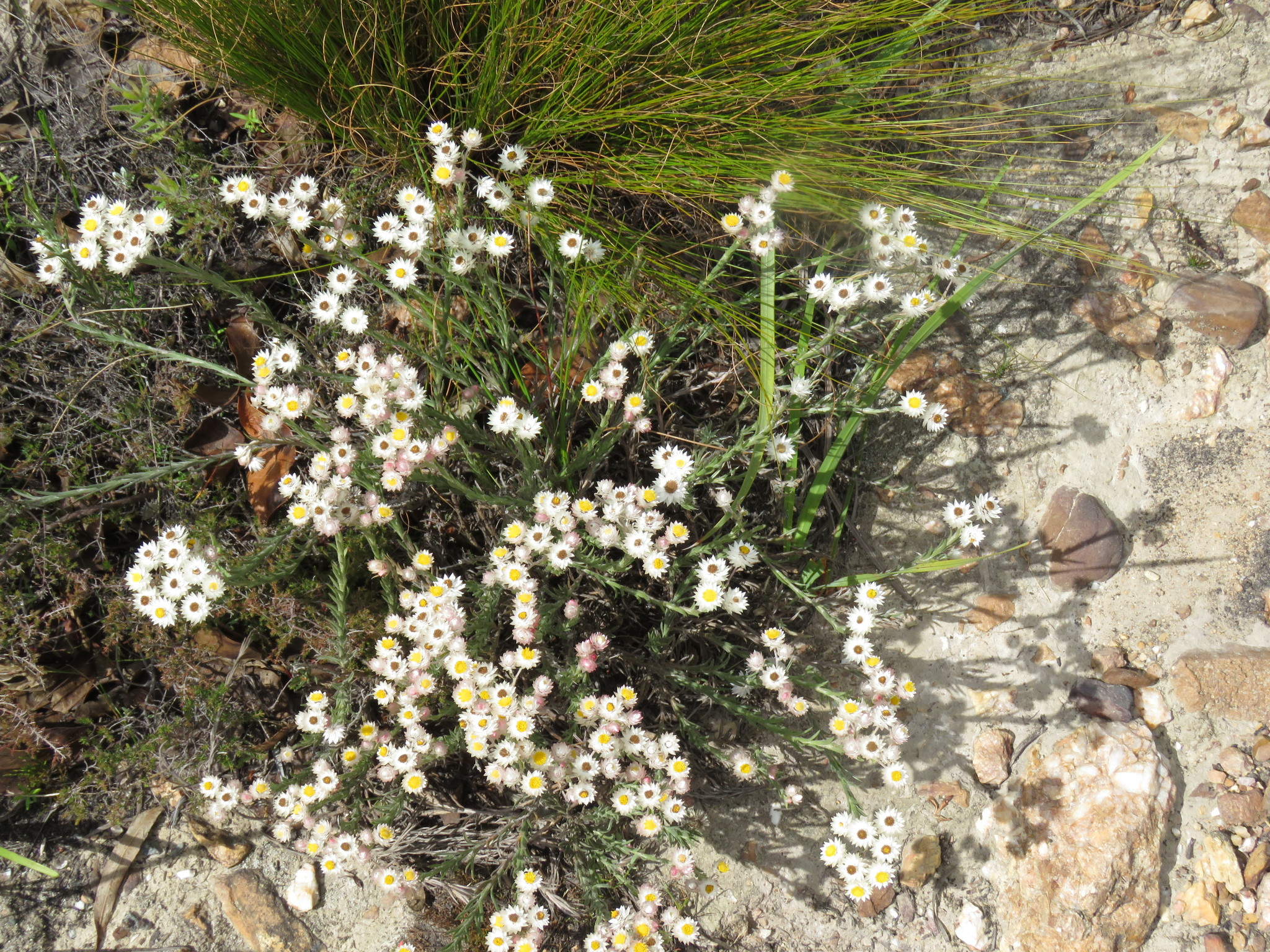
- Achyranthemum paniculatum

Scientific classification
- Kingdom: Plantae
- Clade: Tracheophytes
- Clade: Angiosperms
- Clade: Eudicots
- Clade: Asterids
- Order: Asterales
- Family: Asteraceae
- Tribe: Gnaphalieae
- Genus: Achyranthemum; N.G. Bergh

Species
- see text

= Achyranthemum =

Genus of flowering plant

Achyranthemum, commonly called the chaff flowers, is a genus of flowering plant in the family Asteraceae which is native to South Africa. The genus was first described by Nicola Bergh in 2019 in the South African Journal of Botany, and it was segregated from the genus Syncarpha due to its representation of a separate lineage.

== Description ==
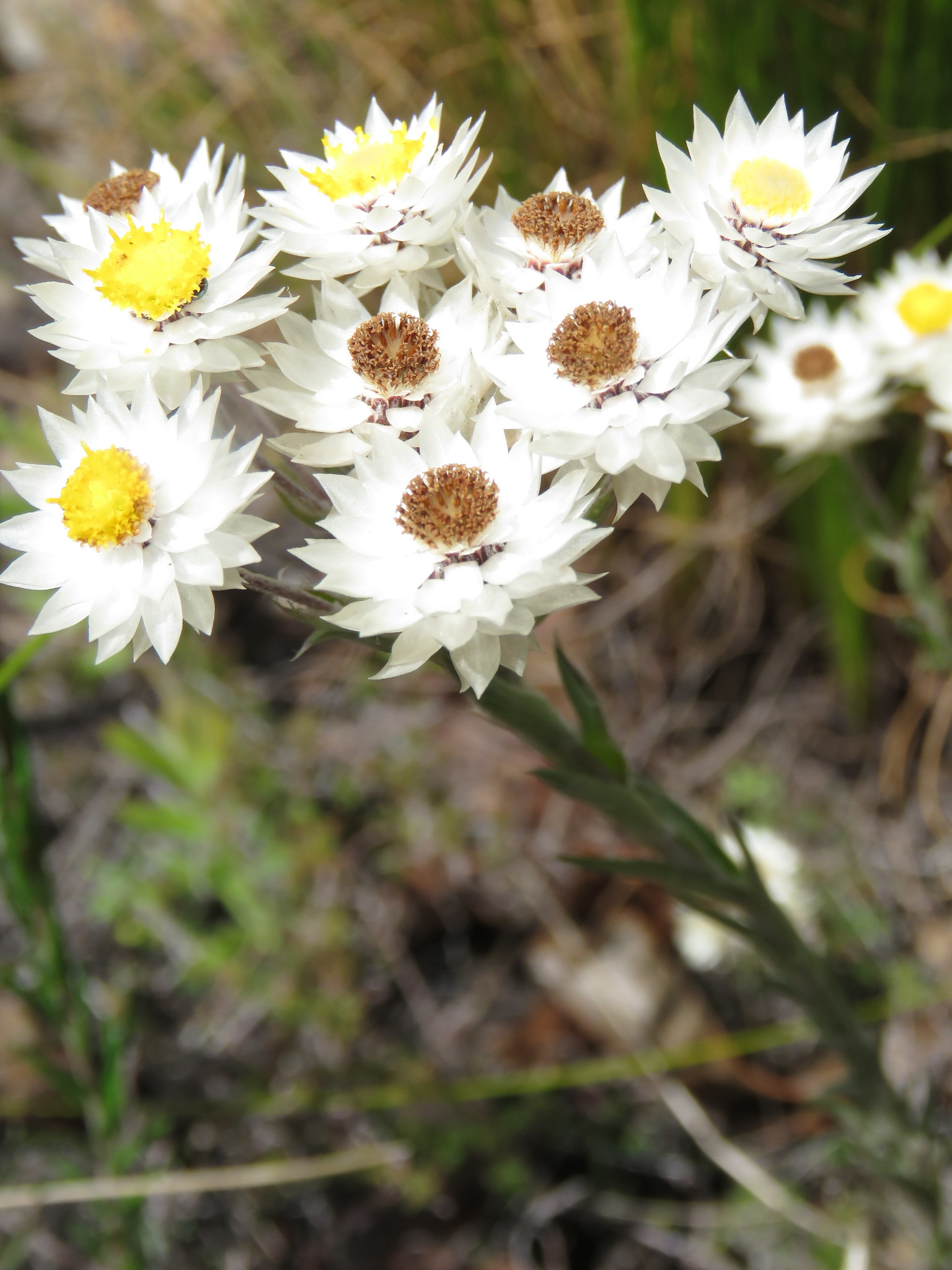
Inflorescence detail of an A. paniculatum specimen in South Africa

Achyranthemum consists of subshrubs whose wood is soft. Their leaves are rigid and thickly covered with wooly gray-white hairs. The tips of the leaves are an acute shape and are often hooked. The capitula are homogamous, which means they consist of only one type of flower. The bracts which surround the capitula are shiny and either white, cream, or yellow. They are often tinged pink, and the stereome at their base is undivided. Their anthers are slender and are at the end of caudicles. The hairs on the cypsela fruit are roughly hemispherical, and its pappus bristles are somewhat rough and fused into a ring at the base.

== Taxonomy ==
=== Name ===
The genus name Achyranthemum comes from the Greek words achyron (chaff) and anthos (flower), which lends the species of the genus their common name, the chaff flowers.

=== Species ===
The following species were placed into Achyranthemum:

- Achyranthemum affine (Less.) N.G.Bergh
- Achyranthemum argenteum (Thunb.) N.G.Bergh
- Achyranthemum mucronatum (P.J.Bergius) N.G.Bergh
- Achyranthemum paniculatum (L.) N.G.Bergh
- Achyranthemum recurvatum (L.f.) N.G.Bergh
- Achyranthemum sordescens (DC.) N.G.Bergh
- Achyranthemum striatum (Thunb.) N.G.Bergh
