= European learning model =

The European Learning Model is a semantic standard used to describe metadata about learning. It is openly licensed, and intended to be used by any stakeholder, in any education, training and employment context, that needs to describe learning data. Available in 29 languages of the European Education Area and candidate country languages, the model can be used in a wide variety of applications, which may include, but not be limited to, describing information on:

· qualifications and learning opportunities (including individual learning accounts);

· qualifications standards such as core vocational profiles;

· credentials awarded to individuals describing their learning activities, achievements, entitlements and/or associated assessments;

· accreditation and licensing of courses, programmes and institutions;

· recognition of qualifications and credentials;

· person identity information and student membership/enrolment in educational institutions.

== History ==
Over the past years, the commission has put in place a range of open standards, reference frameworks and semantic assets to increase data quality and interoperability. While the model was originally aimed to serve as a basis for the European Commission's own applications, the latest version (ELM v3), to be released in Q1-2023, brings together the learning opportunities and qualifications model, the qualifications dataset register model and the European digital credentials model, into a unified structure.
