= Generalized Naszodi-Mendonca method =

Method for analyzing assortative mating

The Generalized Naszodi–Mendonca method, or GNM-method is the generalized version of the NM-method, The NM-method was developed as a statistical approach to construct counterfactual contingency tables, and first applied by Naszodi and Mendonca in 2019, before being used in some other papers. The GNM-method was developed by Naszodi in 2021, and applied by Naszodi and Mendonca in 2023.

== Application ==
The GNM-method can be applied to study various phenomena including assortative mating along multiple traits.

To gain insight on the importance of analyzing sorting along multiple traits, e.g., race and education level, consider a hypothetical society. " In the hypothetical society in question all men and all women marry someone from the opposite sex from their own generation when being young adults. There are two generations in this society: the earlier-born generation and the later-born generation. The education level of the later generation is not different from that of the earlier generation. Moreover, people of a particular race tend to have higher educational attainment than people of another race in both of the generations.

In addition, we make the following assumptions: (i) those belonging to the later generation are exactly as picky about spousal education as the members of the earlier generation were when they were young adults; and (ii) barriers to racial intermarriage have been reduced from one generation to the next, i.e., fewer members in the later-born generation have opposed marrying someone of a different race compared to those in the earlier-born generation.

Under these assumptions one may mistakenly conclude that the degree of educational sorting is decreasing in this hypothetical society. This error can occur if changes in sorting along race are not properly controlled for."

== Comparison with the NM-method ==
While the NM-method is suitable for constructing counterfactual joint distributions of a one-dimensional pair of traits (e.g. husband's education level and wife's education level), the GNM-method can be applied to multidimensional pairs of traits (e.g., husband's education level and race; wife's education level and race).,

The counterfactual constructed by the NM-method can be used to decompose inter-generational changes in the prevalence of (educational) homogamy into the effects due to changes in (i) the structural availability (e.g., the educational distribution of marriageable men and women), (ii) the non-structural factor (e.g., aggregate marital preferences over spousal education, social barriers to marrying out of one's educational group, social marital norms), and (iii) the interaction of changing structural availability and the non-structural factor.

The NM-method provides a unique solution to the counterfactual table (if the counterfactual is not impossible to obtain). Therefore, the components calculated with the counterfactual decompositions based on the NM-method are scalar-valued.

Unlike the NM-method, the GNM-method results in a set of counterfactual tables. Therefore, it provides an interval for the components if being used for counterfactual decompositions.

== Comparison with alternative methods developed to analyze sorting along multiple traits ==
The GNM-method is not the only method developed with the aim of analyzing sorting along more than one trait. For instance, the papers by Chiappori, Oreffice, and Quintana-Domeque (2011) , Galichon and Salanié (2021), Naszodi and Mendonca (2022), and Rosenfeld (2008) propose alternative methods for the same purpose.

"Chiappori et al (2011) provide a closed-form solution of a multidimensional matching model and then they test predictions of how spouses trade off education and non-smoking. In the model by Galichon and Salanié (2021), the surplus from a marriage match depends on the partners' education, race and some other traits unobserved by the econometrician. In the full-fledged micro-founded model of Naszodi and Mendonca (2024), matches are made with the Gale-Shapley algorithm and each individual is assumed to sort along two characteristics: the marriageable person's educational attainment, and their reservation point (used as a proxy for the unobserved traits of the person and empirically identified by the search criteria of a group of dating site users). Finally, Rosenfeld (2008) examines sorting along three dimensions (education, race, and religion) in the US." (see Naszodi and Mendonca 2023).

The distinctive feature of the GNM-method and that of NM-method compared to their alternatives is that they build on a different definition of unchanged non-structural factor (i.e., the driving factor of the prevalence of homogamy other than the structural factor representing changes in the educational distributions of marriageable men and women). According to the GNM and NM, the non-structural factor is constant if the generalized version of the Liu-Lu-indicator is kept fixed. (The original Liu-Lu-indicator is the slightly modified version of the Coleman-index defined by Eq. 15 in the paper by James Coleman 1958.)

The generalized LL-indicator is different from those indicators that form the basis of the alternatives to the GNM and NM-method, such as the regression coefficient (applied by Greenwood et al 2014), the marital surplus (developed by Choo and Siow 2006, while generalized and applied by Chiappori et al. 2011, Galichon and Salanié 2021), and the odds-ratio (applied by Rosenfeld 2008 inter alia).

== Implementation ==
The GNM-method is implemented in Matlab and R. It can be downloaded from Mendeley. The NM-method is implemented in Excel, Visual Basic, R and also in Stata.
