= Triangulation (social science) =

Combining multiple research methods

In the social sciences, triangulation refers to the application and combination of several research methods in the study of the same phenomenon. By combining multiple observers, theories, methods, and empirical materials, researchers hope to overcome the weakness or intrinsic biases and the problems that come from single method, single-observer, and single-theory studies.

It is popularly used in sociology. "The concept of triangulation is borrowed from navigational and land surveying techniques that determine a single point in space with the convergence of measurements taken from two other distinct points."

Triangulation can be used in both quantitative and qualitative studies as an alternative to traditional criteria like reliability and validity.

== Purpose ==
The purpose of triangulation in qualitative research is to increase the credibility and validity of the results. Several scholars have aimed to define triangulation throughout the years.

- Cohen and Manion (2000) define triangulation as an "attempt to map out, or explain more fully, the richness and complexity of human behavior by studying it from more than one standpoint."
- Altrichter et al. (2008) contend that triangulation "gives a more detailed and balanced picture of the situation."
- According to O'Donoghue and Punch (2003), triangulation is a "method of cross-checking data from multiple sources to search for regularities in the research data."

== Types ==
Denzin (2006) identified four basic types of triangulation:

- Data triangulation: involves time, space, and persons. Uses multiple sources of data that all have a similar focus.
- Investigator triangulation: involves multiple researchers in an investigation.
- Theory triangulation: involves using more than one theoretical scheme in the interpretation of the phenomenon.
- Methodological triangulation: involves using more than one method to gather data, such as interviews, observations, questionnaires, and documents.

== See also ==
- Data cleansing
- Data editing
- Iterative proportional fitting for a method of data enhancement applied in statistics, economics and computer science
