= Matching hypothesis =

Mate selection by social desirability

The matching hypothesis (also known as the matching phenomenon) argues that people are more likely to form and succeed in a committed relationship with someone who is equally socially desirable, typically in the form of physical attraction. The hypothesis is derived from the discipline of social psychology and was first proposed by American social psychologist Elaine Hatfield and her colleagues in 1966.

Successful couples of differing physical attractiveness may be together due to other matching variables that compensate for the difference in attractiveness. For instance, some men with wealth and status desire younger, more attractive women. Some women are more likely to overlook physical attractiveness for men who possess wealth and status.

It is also similar to some of the theorems outlined in uncertainty reduction theory, from the post-positivist discipline of communication studies. These theorems include constructs of nonverbal expression, perceived similarity, liking, information seeking, and intimacy, and their correlations to one another.

The matching of similar traits through marriage is also called "homogamy".

== Research ==
=== Walster et al. (1966) ===
Walster advertised a "Computer Match Dance". 752 student participants were rated on physical attractiveness by four independent judges, as a measure of social desirability. Participants were told to fill in a questionnaire for the purposes of computer matching based on similarity. Instead, participants were randomly paired, except no man was paired with a taller woman. During an intermission of the dance, participants were asked to assess their date. People with higher ratings were found to have more harsh judgment of their dates. Furthermore, higher levels of attractiveness indicated lower levels of satisfaction with their pairing, even when they were on the same level. It was also found that both men and women were more satisfied with their dates if their dates had high levels of attractiveness. Physical attractiveness was found to be the most important factor in enjoying the date and whether or not they would sleep with them when propositioned. It was more important than intelligence and personality.

One criticism Walster assigned to the study was that the four judges who assigned the attractiveness ratings to the participants had very brief interactions with them. Longer exposure may have changed the attraction ratings. In a follow-up of the experiment, it was found that couples were more likely to continue interacting if they held similar attraction ratings.

=== Walster and Walster (1971) ===
Walster and Walster ran a follow-up to the Computer Dance, but instead allowed participants to meet beforehand in order to give them greater chance to interact and think about their ideal qualities in a partner. The study had greater ecological validity than the original study, and the finding was that partners that were similar in terms of physical attractiveness expressed the most liking for each other – a finding that supports the matching hypothesis.

=== Murstein (1972) ===
Murstein also found evidence that supported the matching hypothesis. Photos of 197 couples in various statuses of relationship (from casually dating to married), were rated in terms of attractiveness by eight judges. Each person was photographed separately. The judges did not know which photographs went together within romantic partnerships. The ratings from the judges supported the matching hypothesis.

Self-perception and perception of the partner were included in the first round of the study; however, in the later rounds they were removed, as partners not only rated themselves unrealistically high, but their partners even higher.

=== Huston (1973) ===
Huston argued that the evidence for the matching hypothesis didn't come from matching but instead on the tendency of people to avoid rejection hence choosing someone similarly attractive to themselves, to avoid being rejected by someone more attractive than themselves. Huston attempted to prove this by showing participants photos of people who had already indicated that they would accept the participant as a partner. The participant usually chose the person rated as most attractive; however, the study has very flawed ecological validity as the relationship was certain, and in real life people wouldn't be certain hence are still more likely to choose someone of equal attractiveness to avoid possible rejection.

=== White (1980) ===
White conducted a study on 123 dating couples at UCLA. He stated that good physical matches may be conducive to good relationships. The study reported that partners most similar in physical attractiveness were found to rate themselves happier and report deeper feelings of love.

The study also supported that some, especially men, view relationships as a marketplace. If the partnership is weak, an individual may devalue it if they have many friends of the opposite sex who are more attractive. They may look at the situation as having more options present that are more appealing. At the same time, if the relationship is strong, they may value the relationship more because they are passing up on these opportunities in order to remain in the relationship.

=== Brown (1986) ===
Brown argued for the matching hypothesis, but maintained that it results from a learned sense of what is "fitting" – we adjust our expectation of a partner in line with what we believe we have to offer others, instead of a fear of rejection.

=== Garcia and Khersonsky (1996) ===
Garcia and Khersonsky studied this effect and how others view matching and non-matching couples. Participants viewed photos of couples who matched or did not match in physical attractiveness and completed a questionnaire. The questionnaire included ratings of how satisfied the couples appear in their current relationship, their potential marital satisfaction, how likely is it that they will break up and how likely it is that they will be good parents. Results showed that the attractive couple was rated as currently more satisfied than the non-matching couple, where the male was more attractive than the female. Additionally, the unattractive male was rated as more satisfied (currently and marital) than the attractive female in the non-matching couple. The attractive woman was also rated as more satisfied (currently and marital) in the attractive couple.

=== Shaw Taylor et al. (2011) ===
Shaw Taylor performed a series of studies involving the matching hypothesis in online dating. In one of the studies, the attractiveness of 60 males and 60 females were measured and their interactions were monitored. The people with whom they interacted were then monitored to see who they interacted with, and returned messages to. What they found was different from the original construct of matching. People contacted others who were significantly more attractive than they were. However it was found that the person was more likely to reply if they were closer to the same level of attractiveness. This study supported matching but not as something that is intentional.

=== Other studies ===
Further evidence supporting the matching hypothesis was found by:

- Berscheid and Dion (1974)
- Berscheid and Walster et al. (1974)

== Quotations ==
- Price and Vandenberg stated that "the matching phenomenon [of physical attractiveness between marriage partners] is stable within and across generations".
- "Love is often nothing but a favorable exchange between two people who get the most of what they can expect, considering their value on the personality market." — Erich Fromm

== See also ==
- Assortative mating
- Homogamy (sociology)
- Uncertainty reduction theory
