= Homogamy (biology) =

Biological term with multiple meanings

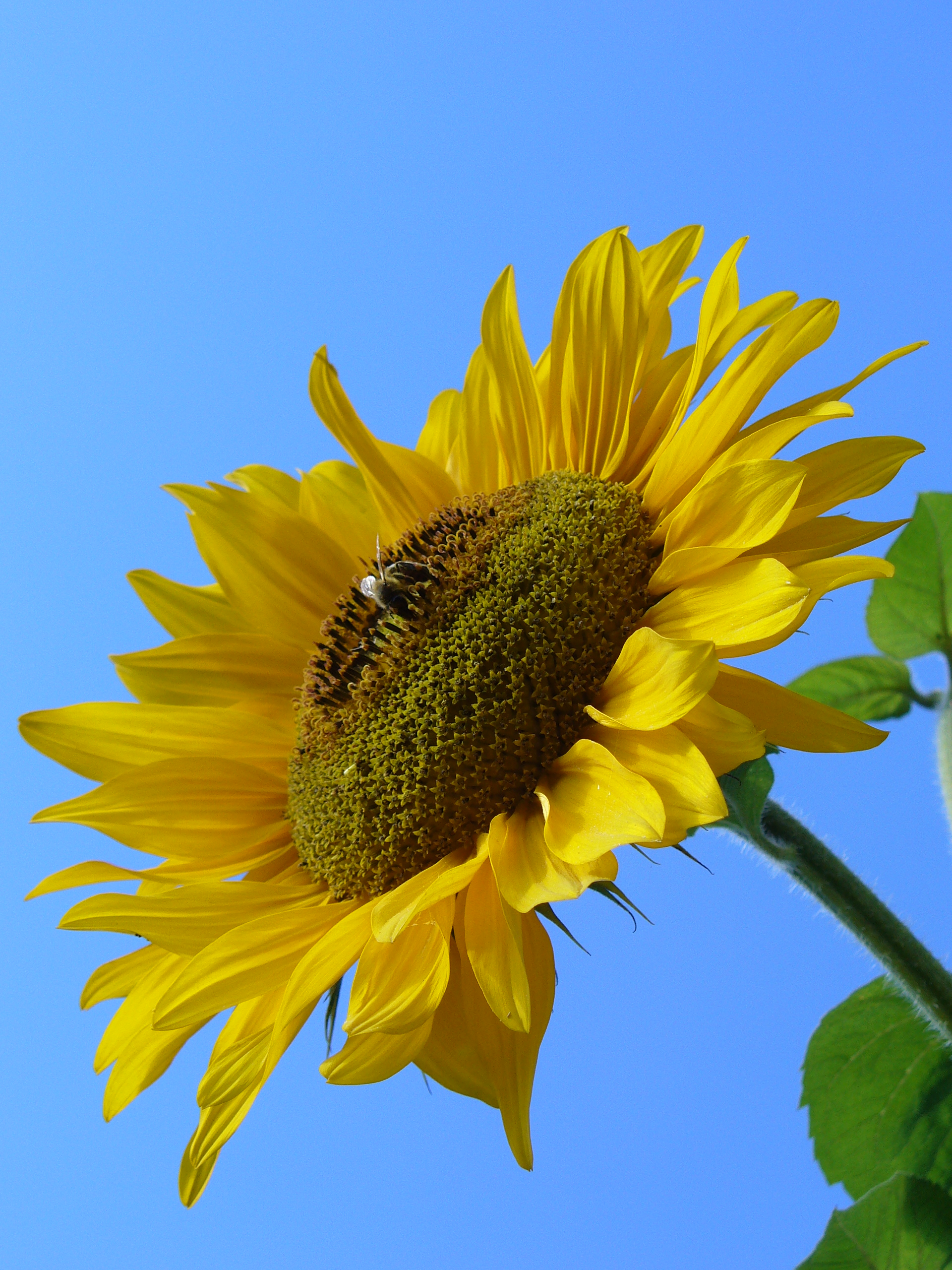
The heterogamous sunflower head is made up of two types of florets: the ray florets near the edge are bilaterally symmetrical with one long petal, and the disk florets in the centre are radially symmetrical with five small petals.

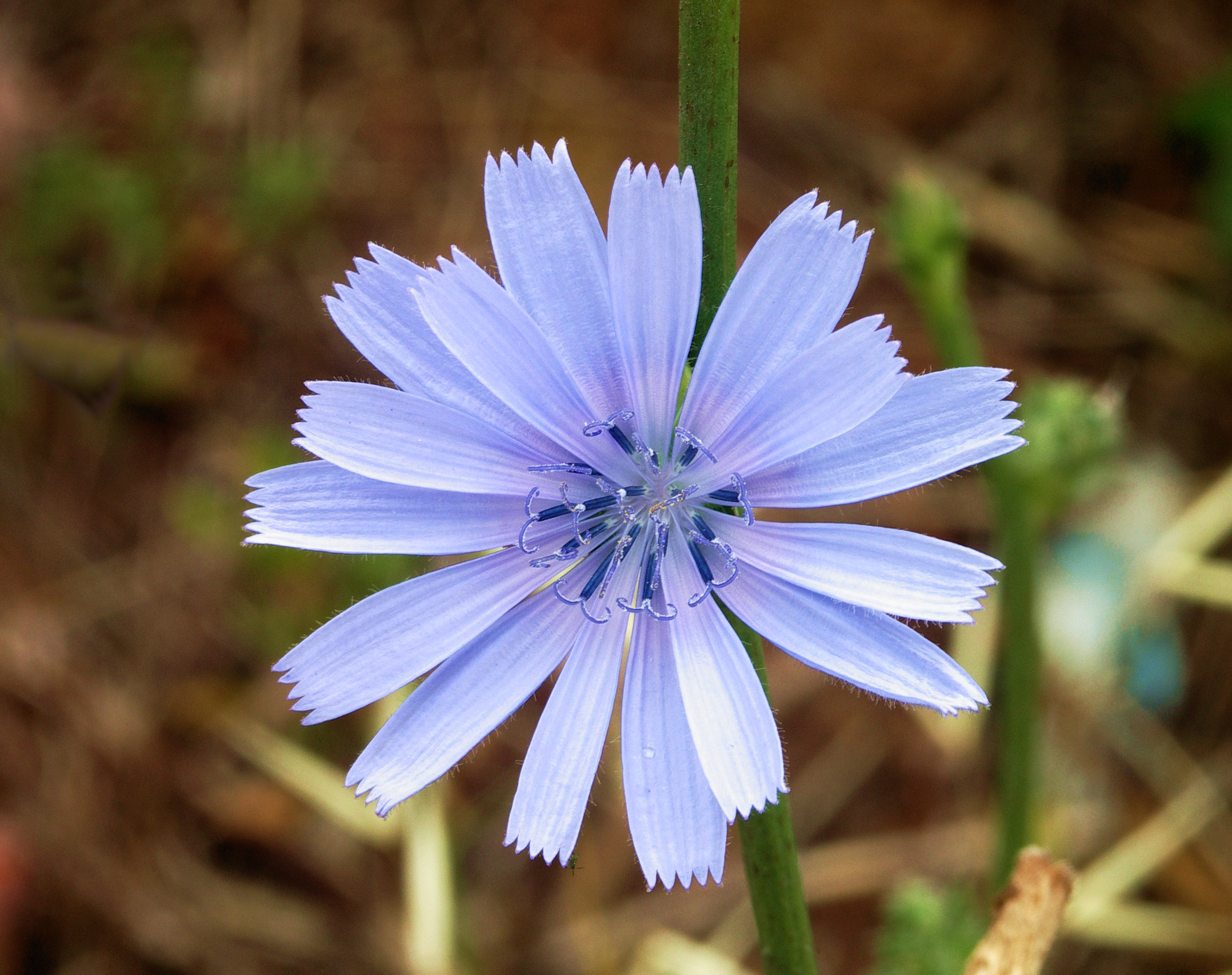
The homogamous chicory flower head is made up of bilaterally symmetrical ray florets, each with one long petal.

Homogamy is used in biology in four separate senses:

- Inbreeding can be referred to as homogamy.
- Homogamy refers to the maturation of male and female reproductive organs (of plants) at the same time, which is also known as simultaneous or synchronous hermaphrodism and is the antonym of dichogamy. Many flowers appear to be homogamous but some of these may not be strictly functionally homogamous, because for various reasons male and female reproduction do not completely overlap.
- In the daisy family, the flower heads are made up of many small flowers called florets, and are either homogamous or heterogamous. Heterogamous heads are made up of two types of florets, ray florets near the edge and disk florets in the center. Homogamous heads are made up of just one type of floret, either all ray florets or all disk florets.
- Homogamy can be used as a form of choosing a mate based on characteristics that are wanted in a sexual partner.

== Inbreeding ==
As opposed to outcrossing or outbreeding, inbreeding is the process by which organisms with common descent come together to mate and eventually procreate. An archetype of inbreeding is self-pollination. When a plant has both anthers and a stigma, the process of inbreeding can occur. Another word for this self-fertilization is autogamy, which is when an anther releases pollen to attach to the stigma on the same plant. Self-pollination is promoted by homogamy. Homogamy is when the anthers and the stigma of a flower are being matured at the same time. The action of self-pollination guides the plant to homozygosity, causing a specific gene to be received from each of the parents leading to the possession of two exact formats of that gene.

== Assortative mating ==
Assortative mating is the choosing of a mate to breed with based on their physical characteristics, phenotypical traits. There are social factors that enhance one's choosing, such as religion, physical traits, and culture. For instance, research has been conducted by sociologists who found that men and women look for individuals who fall under the educational homogamy he or she is in. The homogamy theory holds that when organisms look for a potential partner, they search for organisms that have similar traits to themselves. The idea of sexual imprinting plays a role in this theory. Based on whether or not an individual is a male or a female, the individual tends to be attracted to other people that have most similar characteristics to their parent of the opposite gender. This is a form of positive assortative mating, where people choose a mate with attributes that correlate with their own. According to Kalmijn and Flap, there are five places individuals could become acquainted with each other in. These five places are: work, school, neighborhood, common family networks, and voluntary associations. They also studied the five criteria that are usually looked for to decide on the status of wanting to mate. As such, the five traits are: age, education, class destinations, class origins, and religious background.

== Evolutionary aspect ==
There is an evolutionary theory that explain that there are two specific qualities that are looked out. These two traits are male dominance and the attractiveness of the female. According to the evolutionary perspective, the purpose of mating is to procreate for the purpose of survival. It is the ones with the best features and traits that survive, a known phrase called survival of the fittest. If there was a couple who lacked the ability to become fertile or have a child with a disease or a handicap, there is a great rise in the risk of the couple receiving a divorce. When there are traits that are found in a spouse that are not favorable, then the homogamy in the relationship decreases, and there begins to have a need for it for a better production of children.
