= VACUUM =

Training guidance principles

VACUUM is a set of normative guidance principles for achieving training and test dataset quality for structured datasets in data science and machine learning. The garbage-in, garbage out principle motivates a solution to the problem of data quality but does not offer a specific solution. Unlike the majority of the ad-hoc data quality assessment metrics often used by practitioners VACUUM specifies qualitative principles for data quality management and serves as a basis for defining more detailed quantitative metrics of data quality.

VACUUM is an acronym that stands for:

- valid
- accurate
- consistent
- uniform
- unified
- model
