= Frederick F. Stephan =

American statistician and sociologist

Frederick Franklin Stephan (May 17, 1903 – August 3, 1971) was an American statistician and sociologist, mainly known for his contributions to survey sampling procedures.

== Education and career ==
Born in Chicago, he received his B.A. from the University of Illinois in 1924 and an M.A. in sociology from the University of Chicago in 1926. He taught at the University of Pittsburgh and at Cornell University, before he moved to Princeton University in 1947, where he was Professor of Social Statistics until his retirement in 1971, shortly before his death.

Together with W. Edwards Deming, he introduced the iterative proportional fitting algorithm to estimate cell probabilities in contingency tables subject to constraints on the margins.

He served as president of AAPOR in 1957–8, and as president of the American Statistical Association in 1966.

== Recognition ==
He was named a Fellow of the American Statistical Association in 1939.

== Personal life ==
John Stephan was his brother.
