= Homogamy (sociology) =

Marriage between individuals who are similar to each other

Homogamy is marriage between individuals who are, in some culturally important way, similar to each other. It is a form of assortative mating. The union may be based on socioeconomic status, class, gender, caste, ethnicity, or religion, or age in the case of the so-called age homogamy.

It can also refer to the socialization customs of a particular group in that people who are similar tend to socialize with one another.

== Criteria for mates ==
There are three criteria with which people evaluate potential mates: warmth and loyalty, attractiveness and vitality, and status and resources. These three categories can heavily shape themselves around the secondary traits of ethnicity, religion, and socio-economic status.

Ethnicity can be tied to perceptions of biological vitality and attractiveness. Socio-economic status relates directly to status and resources. Religious or spiritual beliefs directly impact interpersonal behavior; people tend to be warmer and more trustworthy to those with similar beliefs. Homogamy is an unsurprising phenomenon regarding people's liking and nurturing of others who are like them, may look like them, and act like them.

Homogamy is the broader precursor of endogamy, which encompasses homogamy in its definition but also includes an open refusal of others on the basis of conflicting traits, appearance, and fiscal worth. Homogamy is much less rigid in structure; a couple can belong to different denominations of Christianity but this will not be a point of contention in the relationship.

=== Religion ===
The integration of social science research and religion has given researchers a new insight into variables that affect marriage. Thomas and Cornwall (1990) state that the growing body of research is focused towards marital stratification and religiosity findings indicate that the ratio of higher religiosity within a marriage indicate a happier and stable partnership.

According to data collected from 700 couples in their first marriage and 300 couples in a remarriage of; religious and non-religious/ non-practicing, conclude the following. The majority of religious couples who attend their denominational/non-denominational church regularly experience a higher level of satisfaction in their martial relationship compared to non-practicing couples. Religious couples experience increased commitment and tend to be happier because of the stability and guide lines that religion poses on marriage. Findings in other areas of research also support that same-faith or inter-faith marriages tend to be stronger and more prosperous than non-religious marriages. According to Kalmijn (1998) there are three resources of culture to acknowledge.

- First, couples who share religious beliefs tend to communicate and interact more effectively based on doctrine, and may also positively reinforce and encourage each other.
- Second, opinions and values shared between spouses may lead to similar behaviour and perspective of the world.
- Third, religious views that are compatible may lead to joint exercises in both religious and nonreligious endeavours, this can only strengthen the relationship indefinitely.

Ellison and Curtis (2002) wrote that decisions on issues relating to family matters may result in greater consensus among couples who choose homogamy. Also, Church attendance provides a close network of support for couples. Marital separation between couples attending a denominational and non-denominational church is generally frowned upon and stigmatized.

=== Socioeconomic status ===
It is often seen that people choose to marry within their sociological group or with someone who is close to them in status. Characteristics such as ethnicity, race, religion, and socioeconomic status play a role in how someone chooses their spouse. Socioeconomic status can be defined as an individual's income, level of education, and occupation. Research on socioeconomic status of homogamy was developed by stratification researchers who used marriage patterns in conjunction with mobility patterns to describe how open stratification systems are. (Kalmijn, 2). Socioeconomic status can be divided into two studies: ascribed status and achieved status. Ascribed status simply means the occupational class of the father or father in law while achieved status is one's education and occupation. Ascribed status has become less important while achieved status and education have not lost their importance.

Most countries look at the educational status because it is easier for them to judge the individual. The trends of socioeconomic homogamy are studied by the analysis of class, background and education. There has been a decline in a few industrialized countries regarding the importance of the social background for marriage choice; United States, Hungary, France and the Netherlands. (Kalmijn, 17). Today parents do not have any control over their children as the kids spend more time at college or university, increasing their social background. Education has become important for both the cultural taste and socioeconomic status. After education, falls the romantic consideration, when high standard of living is everyone's main goal.

== See also ==
- Endogamy
- Hypergamy
- Homosexuality
- Matching hypothesis
