= Assortative mating =

Preferential mating pattern between individuals with similar phenotypes

Assortative mating (also referred to as positive assortative mating or homogamy) is a mating pattern and a form of sexual selection in which individuals with similar phenotypes or genotypes mate with one another more frequently than would be expected under a random mating pattern.

A majority of the phenotypes that are subject to assortative mating are body size, visual signals (e.g. color, pattern), and secondary sexual traits such as crest size.

The opposite of assortative is disassortative mating, also referred to "negative assortative mating", in which case its opposite is termed "positive assortative mating".

== Causes ==
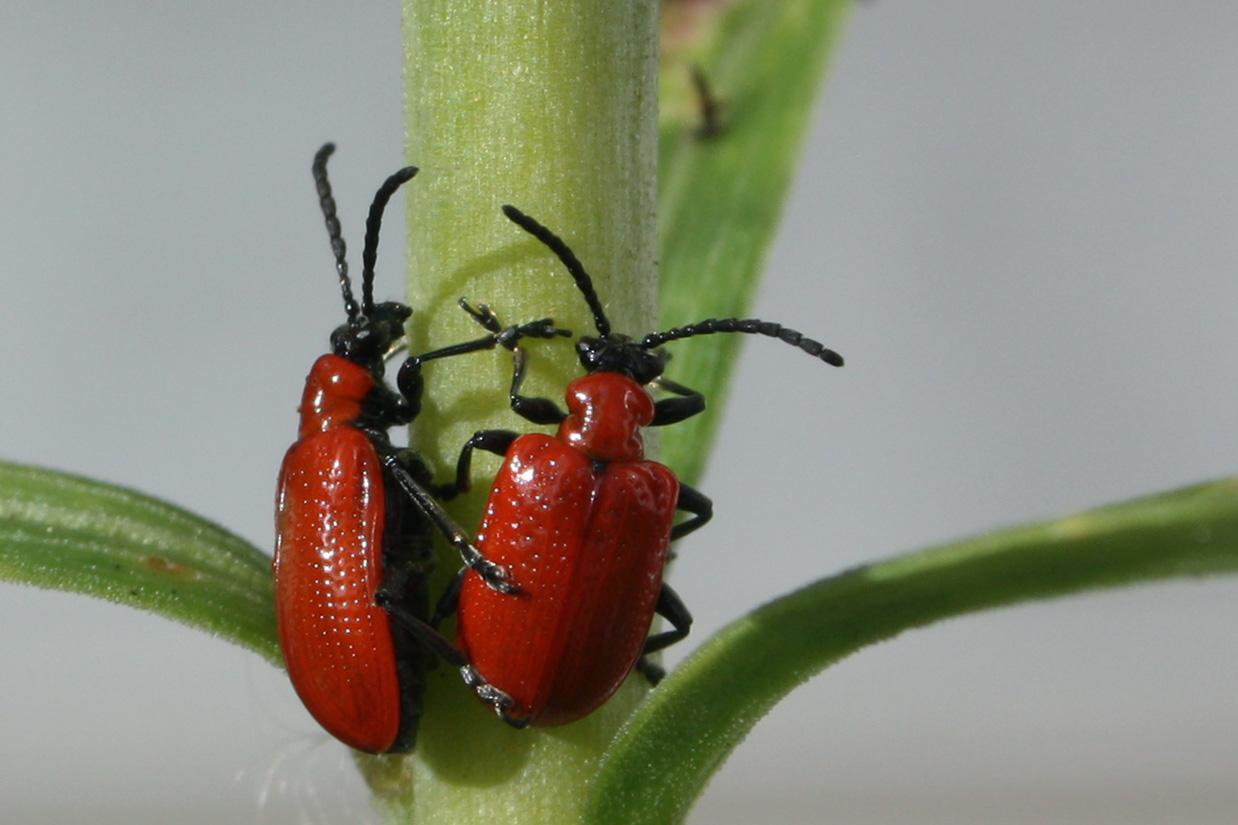
Leaf beetle

Several hypotheses have been proposed to explain the phenomenon of assortative mating. Assortative mating has evolved from a combination of different factors, which vary across different species.

Assortative mating with respect to body size can arise as a consequence of intrasexual competition. In some species, size is correlated with fecundity in females. Therefore, males choose to mate with larger females, with the larger males defeating the smaller males in courting them. Examples of species that display this type of assortative mating include the jumping spider Phidippus clarus and the leaf beetle Diaprepes abbreviatus. In other cases, larger females are better equipped to resist male courtship attempts, and only the largest males are able to mate with them.

Assortative mating can, at times, arise as a consequence of social competition. Traits in certain individuals may indicate competitive ability which allows them to occupy the best territories. Individuals with similar traits that occupy similar territories are more likely to mate with one another. In this scenario, assortative mating does not necessarily arise from choice, but rather by proximity. This was noted in western bluebirds although there is no definite evidence that this is the major factor resulting in color dependent assortative mating in this species. Different factors may apply simultaneously to result in assortative mating in any given species.

Assortative mating can also arise when a heritable preference and the trait it targets are co-inherited. Individuals carrying a preference for a particular trait are more likely to mate with individuals who possess that trait, so their offspring inherit genes associated with both the preference and the trait. Over generations, this genetic correlation reinforces mating between phenotypically similar individuals, even when the original preference was not specifically for similarity itself.

== In non-human animals ==
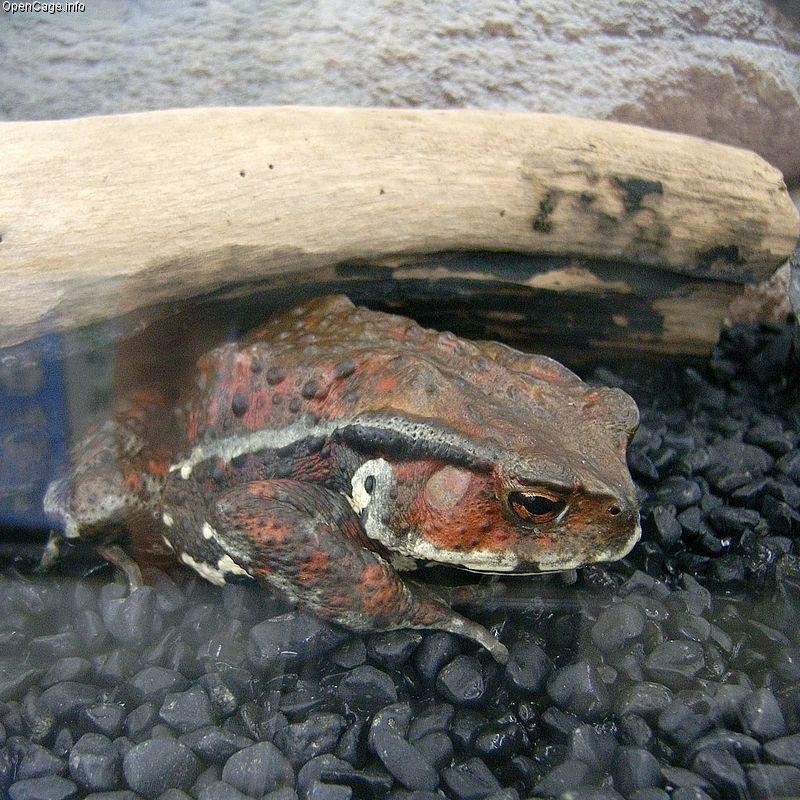
Japanese common toad

Assortative mating in animals has been observed with respect to body size and color. Size-related assortative mating is prevalent across many species of vertebrates and invertebrates. It has been found in the simultaneous hermaphrodites such as the land snail Bradybaena pellucida. One reason for its occurrence can be reciprocal intromission (i.e. both individuals provide both male and female gametes during a single mating) that happens in this species. Therefore, individuals with similar body size pair up with one another to facilitate this exchange. Moreover, it is known that larger individuals in such hermaphroditic species produce more eggs, so mutual mate choice is another factor leading to assortative mating in this species.

Evidence for size-related assortative mating has also been found in the mangrove snail (Littoraria ardouiniana), and in the Japanese common toad, Bufo japonicus.

The second common type of assortative mating occurs with respect to coloration. This type of assortative mating is more common in socially monogamous bird species such as the eastern bluebirds (Sialia sialis) and western bluebirds (Sialia mexicana). In both species more brightly colored males mated with more brightly colored females and less brightly colored individuals paired with one another. Eastern bluebirds also mate assortatively for territorial aggression due to fierce competition for a limited number of nesting sites with tree swallows. Two highly aggressive individuals are better equipped to protect their nest, encouraging assortative mating between such individuals.

Assortative mating with respect to two common color morphs: striped and unstriped also exists in a polymorphic population of eastern red-backed salamanders (Plethodon cinereus).

Assortative mating is also found in many socially monogamous species of birds. Monogamous species are often involved in bi-parental care of their offspring. Since males are equally invested in the offspring as the mother, both genders are expected to display mate choice, a phenomenon termed as mutual mate choice. Mutual mate choice occurs when both males and females are searching for a mate that will maximize their fitness. In birds, female and male ornamentation can indicate better overall condition or such individuals might have better genes, or be better suited as parents.

== In humans ==
Assortative mating in humans has been widely observed and studied, and can be broken down into two types of human assortative mating. These are:

- genetic assortative mating (assortative mating with mate choice based on genetic type and phenotypical expression); and
- social assortative mating (assortative mating with mate choice based on social, cultural, and other societal factors)

Genetic assortative mating is well studied and documented. In 1903 Pearson and colleagues reported strong correlations in height, span of arms, and the length of the left forearm between husband and wife in 1000 couples. Assortative mating with regard to appearance does not end there. Males prefer female faces that resemble their own when provided images of three women, with one image modified to resemble their own. However, the same result does not apply to females selecting male faces. Genetically related individuals (3rd or 4th cousin level) exhibit higher fitness than unrelated individuals.

Assortative mating based on genomic similarities plays a role in human marriages in the United States. Spouses are more genetically similar to each other than two randomly chosen individuals. The probability of marriage increases by roughly 15% for every one standard deviation increase in genetic similarity. However, some researchers argue that this assortative mating is caused purely by population stratification (the fact that people are more likely to marry within ethnic subgroups such as Swedish-Americans).

At the same time, individuals display disassortative mating for genes in the major histocompatibility complex region on chromosome 6. Individuals feel more attracted to odors of individuals who are genetically different in this region. This promotes MHC heterozygosity in the children, making them less vulnerable to pathogens. Apart from humans, disassortative mating with regard to the MHC coding region has been widely studied in mice, and has also been reported to occur in fish.

In addition to genetic assortative mating, humans also demonstrate patterns of assortative mating based on sociological factors as well. Sociological assortative mating is typically broken down into three categories, mate choice based on socio-economic status, mate choice based on racial or ethnic background, and mate choice based on religious beliefs.

Assortative mating based on socio-economic status is the broadest of these general categories. It includes the tendency of humans to prefer to mate within their socio-economic peers, that is, those with similar social standing, job prestige, educational attainment, or economic background as they themselves. This tendency has always been present in society: there was no historical area when most of the individuals preferred to sort, and had actually sorted, negatively into couples or matched randomly along these traits. Still, this tendency was weaker in some generations than in others. For instance, in the 20th century in the Western world, late Boomers had weaker aggregate preferences for educational homogamy than early Boomers had when being young adults; also, the members of the early Generation-X were typically much less "picky" about spousal education than the members of the late Generation-X were. It is worth noting that one can identify the U-shaped trend in Americans' educational homophily only by using a suitable method for the purpose. The U-shaped trend is considered to be plausible since it is evidenced by the search criteria of online dating site users, survey evidence of self-declared preferences, and the U-shaped pattern of income inequality in the US.

Another form of sociological assortative mating is assortative mating based on racial and ethnic background. Mentioned above in the context of the genetically similar preferring to mate with one another, this form of assortative mating can take many varied and complicated forms. While the tendency mentioned above does exist, and people do tend to marry those genetically similar to themselves, especially if within the same racial or ethnic group, this trend can change in various ways. It is common, for example, for the barriers to intermarriage with the general population experienced by a minority population to decrease as the numbers of the minority population increase. This assimilation reduces the prevalence of this form of assortative mating. However, growth of a minority population does not necessarily lead to decreased barriers to intermarriage. This can be seen in the sharp increase in the non-white Hispanic population of the United States in the 1990s and 2000s that correlated with a sharp decrease in the percentage of non-white Hispanics intermarrying with the general population.

Religious assortative mating is the tendency of individuals to marry within their own religious group. This tendency is prevalent and observable, and changes according to three main factors. The first of these is the proportion of available spouses in the area who already follow the same religion as the person searching for a mate. Areas where religious beliefs are already similar for most people will always have high degrees of religious inbreeding. The second is the social distance between the intermarrying religious groups, or the physical proximity and social interactivity of these groups. Finally, the third factor is the personal views one holds towards marrying outside of a religion. Those who greatly value adherence to religious tradition may be more likely to be averse to marrying across religious lines. Although not necessarily religious, a good example of humans mating assortatively based on belief structure can be found in the tendency of humans to marry based on levels of charitable giving. Couples show similarities in terms of their contributions to public betterment and charities, and this can be attributed to mate choice based on generosity rather than phenotypic convergence.

Assortative mating also occurs among people with mental disorders such as ADHD, in which one person with ADHD is more likely to marry or have a child with another individual with ADHD.

== Effects ==
Assortative mating has reproductive consequences. Positive assortative mating increases genetic relatedness within a family, whereas negative assortative mating accomplishes the opposite effect. Either strategy may be employed by the individuals of a species depending upon which strategy maximizes fitness and enables the individuals to maximally pass on their genes to the next generation. For instance, in the case of eastern bluebirds, assortative mating for territorial aggression increases the probability of the parents obtaining and securing a nest site for their offspring. This in turn increases the likelihood of survival of the offspring and consequently fitness of the individuals. In birds whose coloration represents well being and fecundity of the bird, positive assortative mating for color increases the chances of genes being passed on and of the offspring being in good condition. Also, positive assortative mating for behavioral traits allows for more efficient communication between the individuals and they can cooperate better to raise their offspring.

On the other hand, mating between individuals of genotypes which are too similar allows for the accumulation of harmful recessive alleles, which can decrease fitness. Such mating between genetically similar individuals is termed inbreeding which can result in the emergence of autosomal recessive disorders. Moreover, assortative mating for aggression in birds can lead to inadequate parental care. An alternate strategy can be disassortative mating, in which one individual is aggressive and guards the nest site while the other individual is more nurturing and fosters the young; however, this risks the breakdown of coadapted gene complexes, leading to outbreeding depression. This division of labor increases the chances of survival of the offspring. A classic example of this is in the case of the white-throated sparrow (Zonotrichia albicollis). This bird exhibits two color morphs – white striped and tan striped. In both sexes, the white striped birds are more aggressive and territorial whereas tan striped birds are more engaged in providing parental care to their offspring. Therefore, disassortative mating in these birds allows for an efficient division of labor in terms of raising and protecting their offspring.

Positive assortative mating is a key element leading to reproductive isolation within a species, which in turn may result speciation in sympatry over time. Sympatric speciation is defined as the evolution of a new species without geographical isolation. Speciation from assortative mating has occurred in the Middle East blind mole rat, cicadas, and the European corn borer.

Like other animals, humans also display these genetic results of assortative mating. What makes humans unique, however, is the tendency towards seeking mates that are not only similar to them in genetics and in appearances, but those who are similar to them economically, socially, educationally, and culturally. These tendencies toward using sociological characteristics to select a mate has many effects on the lives and livelihoods of those who choose to marry one another, as well as their children and future generations. Within a generation, assortative mating is sometimes cited as a source of inequality, as those who mate assortatively would marry people of similar station to themselves, thus amplifying their current station. There is debate, however, about whether this growing preference for educational and occupational similarities in spouses is due to increased preferences for these traits or the shift in workload that occurred as women entered the workforce. This concentration of wealth in families also perpetuates across generations as parents pass their wealth on to their children, with each successive generation inheriting the resources of both of its parents. The combined resources of the parents allow them to give their child a better life growing up, and the combined inheritances from both parents place them at an even greater advantage than they would be with their superior education and childhoods. This has an enormous impact on the development of the social economic structure of a society.

== Economics ==
A related concept of 'assortative matching' has been developed within economics. This relates to efficiencies in production available if workers are evenly matched in their skills or productivity. A consideration of this assortative matching forms the basis of Kremer's 1993 O-ring theory of economic development.

== See also ==
- Directional selection
- Disruptive selection
- Endogamy
- Genetic sexual attraction
- Koinophilia
- Matching hypothesis
- Negative selection (natural selection)
- Reinforcement (speciation)
