= Degenerate dimension =

According to Ralph Kimball, in a data warehouse, a degenerate dimension is a dimension key (primary key for a dimension table) in the fact table that does not have its own dimension table, because all the interesting attributes have been placed in analytic dimensions. The term "degenerate dimension" was originated by Ralph Kimball.

As Bob Becker says:

Degenerate dimensions commonly occur when the fact table's grain is a single transaction (or transaction line). Transaction control header numbers assigned by the operational business process are typically degenerate dimensions, such as order, ticket, credit card transaction, or check numbers. These degenerate dimensions are natural keys of the "parents" of the line items.
Even though there is no corresponding dimension table of attributes, degenerate dimensions can be quite useful for grouping together related fact tables rows. For example, retail point-of-sale transaction numbers tie all the individual items purchased together into a single market basket. In health care, degenerate dimensions can group the claims items related to a single hospital stay or episode of care.

== Other uses of the term ==
Although most writers and practitioners use the term degenerate dimension correctly, it is very easy to find misleading definitions in online and printed sources. For example, the Oracle FAQ defines a degenerate dimension as a "data dimension that is stored in the fact table rather than a separate dimension table. This eliminates the need to join to a dimension table. You can use the data in the degenerate dimension to limit or 'slice and dice' your fact table measures."

This common interpretation implies that it is good dimensional modeling practice to place dimension attributes in the fact table, as long as you call them a degenerate dimension. This is not the case; the concept of degenerate dimension was developed by Kimball to support a specific, well-defined exception to the otherwise ironclad rule that dimension attributes are always pulled out into dimension tables.

== See also ==
- Data warehouse
- Dimension table
- Early-arriving fact
- Fact table
- Measure (data warehouse)

== Bibliography ==
- Kimball, Ralph et al. (1998); The Data Warehouse Lifecycle Toolkit, p17. Pub. Wiley. ISBN 0-471-25547-5.
- Kimball, Ralph (1996); The Data Warehouse Toolkit, p. 100. Pub. Wiley. ISBN 0-471-15337-0.
