= Fact constellation =

Database schema

A fact constellation schema, also referred to as a galaxy schema, is a model using multiple fact tables and multiple dimension tables. These schemas are implemented for complex data warehouses.

The fact constellation is a measure of online analytical processing and can be seen as an extension of the star schema.

A fact constellation schema has multiple fact tables. It is a widely used schema and more complex than star schemas and snowflake schemas. It is possible to create a fact constellation schema by splitting the original star schema into more star schemas. It has many fact tables and some common dimension tables.

== See also ==
- Online analytical processing
- Snowflake schema
