= Reverse star schema =

Schema optimized for fast data retrieval

The reverse star schema is a schema optimized for fast retrieval of large quantities of descriptive data. The design was derived from a warehouse star schema, and its adaptation for descriptive data required that certain key characteristics of the classic star schema be "reversed".

== Model ==
The relation of the central table to those in dimension tables is one-to-many, or in some cases many-to-many rather than many-to-one; the primary keys of the central table are the foreign keys in dimension tables, and the main tables are, in general, smaller than the dimension tables.

Main table columns are typically the source of query constraints, as opposed to dimension tables in the classical star schema. By starting queries with the smaller table, many results are filtered out early in the querying process, thereby streamlining the entire search path.

To add further flexibility, more than one main table is allowed, with main and submain tables having a one-to-many relation. Each main table can have its own dimension tables. To provide further query optimization, a data set can be partitioned into separate physical schemas on either the same database server or different database servers.

== See also ==
- Snowflake schema
