= MILEPOST GCC =

Self-tuning compiler

- Developer: cTuning foundation / MILEPOST consortium
- Release: 2009
- Stable release: 4.4.x / May 21, 2010
- Operating system: Cross-platform
- Type: Compiler
- License: GNU General Public License (version 3 or later)
- Website: GitHub, online API, cTuning.org/ctuning-cc, cTuning.org/milepost-gcc
- Repository: github.com/ctuning/reproduce-milepost-project

MILEPOST GCC is a free, community-driven, open-source, adaptive, self-tuning compiler that combines stable production-quality GCC, Interactive Compilation Interface and machine learning plugins to adapt to any given architecture and program automatically and predict profitable optimizations to improve program execution time, code size and compilation time. It is currently used and supported by academia and industry and is intended to open up research opportunities to automate compiler and architecture design and optimization.

MILEPOST GCC is currently a part of the community-driven Collective Tuning Initiative (cTuning) to enable self-tuning computing systems based on collaborative open-source R&D infrastructure with unified interfaces and to improve the quality and reproducibility of research on code and architecture optimization. MILEPOST GCC is connected with the Collective Optimization Database to collect and reuse profitable optimization cases from the community and predict high-quality optimizations based on statistical analysis of past optimization data.

In January 2018, the cTuning foundation and the Raspberry Pi Foundation published an interactive article featuring MILEPOST GCC and Collective Knowledge framework "for collaborative research into multi-objective autotuning and machine learning techniques."
