= CTuning foundation =

The cTuning Foundation
- Founded: 2014; 12 years ago
- Founder: Grigori Fursin
- Type: Non-profit research and development organization, Engineering organization
- Registration no.: W943003814
- Purpose: Collaborative software, Open Science, Open Source Software, Reproducibility, Computer Science, Machine learning, Artifact Evaluation, Performance tuning, Knowledge management
- Location: Cachan
- Origins: Collective Tuning Initiative & Milepost GCC
- Region served: Worldwide
- Method: Develop open-source tools, a public repository of knowledge, and a common methodology for collaborative and reproducible experimentation
- Website: ctuning.org

The cTuning Foundation is a global non-profit organization developing a common methodology and open-source tools to support sustainable, collaborative and reproducible research in Computer science and organize and automate artifact evaluation and reproducibility inititiaves at machine learning and systems conferences and journals.

== Notable projects ==
- Collective Mind - a Python package with a collection of portable, extensible and ready-to-use automation recipes with a human-friendly interface to help the community compose, benchmark and optimize complex AI, ML and other applications and systems across diverse and continuously changing models, data sets, software and hardware.
- Collective Knowledge - an open-source framework to organize software projects as a database of reusable components with common automation actions and extensible meta descriptions based on FAIR principles, implement portable research workflows, and crowdsource experiments across diverse platforms provided by volunteers.
- ACM ReQuEST - Reproducible Quality-Efficient Systems Tournaments to co-design efficient software/hardware stacks for deep learning algorithms in terms of speed, accuracy and costs across diverse platforms, environments, libraries, models and data sets
- MILEPOST GCC - open-source technology to build machine learning based self-optimizing compilers.
- Artifact Evaluation - validation of experimental results from published papers at the computer systems and machine learning conferences.
- Reproducible Papers - a public index of reproducible papers with portable workflows and reusable research components.

== History ==
Grigori Fursin developed cTuning.org at the end of the Milepost project in 2009 to continue his research on machine learning based program and architecture optimization as a community effort.

In 2014, cTuning Foundation was registered in France as a non-profit research and development organization. It received funding from the EU TETRACOM project and ARM to develop the Collective Knowledge Framework and prepare reproducible research methodology for ACM and IEEE conferences.

In 2020, cTuning Foundation joined MLCommons as a founding member to accelerate innovation in ML.

In 2023, cTuning Foundation joined the new initiative by the Autonomous Vehicle Computing Consortium and MLCommons to develop an automotive industry standard machine learning benchmark suite.

Since 2024, cTuning Foundation supports the MLCommons Croissant Metadata Format to help standardize ML Datasets.

== Funding ==
Current funding comes from the European Union research and development funding programme, Microsoft, and other organizations.
