= Early-arriving fact =

Dimensional Data modeling scenario

In the data warehouse practice of extract, transform, load (ETL), an early fact or early-arriving fact, also known as late-arriving dimension or late-arriving data, denotes the detection of a dimensional natural key during fact table source loading, prior to the assignment of a corresponding primary key or surrogate key in the dimension table. Hence, the fact which cites the dimension arrives early, relative to the definition of the dimension value. An example could be backdating or making corrections to data.

== Handling ==
Procedurally, an early fact can be treated several ways:

- As an error: On the presumption that the dimensional attribute values should have been collected before fact source loading
- As a valid fact, pause loading: The collection pauses whilst the missing dimensional attribute value itself is collected
- As a valid fact, load with dummy keys: A primary key value is generated on the dimension with no attributes (stub / dummy row), the fact completes processing, and the dimension attributes are populated (overwritten) later in the load processing on the new row
- Classify as a Suspense record: Assuming that the associated dimensional attribute was expected by process, move this fact record in a Suspense table and activate alert/SOPs (reporting mismatch [sum/count/aggr], business/data steward, manual correction etc.) In rare circumstances, the suspense records may also be combined (UNION) with the fact table to ensure the metrics are correctly calculated.
