= Aggregate (data warehouse) =

Cached summaries to speed up queries

An aggregate is a type of summary used in dimensional models of data warehouses to shorten the time it takes to provide answers to typical queries on large sets of data. The reason why aggregates can make such a dramatic increase in the performance of a data warehouse is the reduction of the number of rows to be accessed when responding to a query.

== Use ==
In its simplest form, an aggregate is a simple summary table that can be derived by performing a Group by SQL query. A more common use of aggregates is to take a dimension and change its granularity. When changing the granularity of the dimension the fact table has to be partially summarized to fit the new grain of the new dimension, thus creating new dimensional and fact tables, to fit this new level of grain.

== Design ==
Aggregates are sometimes referred to as pre-calculated summary data, since aggregations are usually precomputed, partially summarized data, that are stored in new aggregated tables. When facts are aggregated, it is either done by eliminating dimensionality or by associating the facts with a rolled up dimension. Rolled up dimensions should be shrunken versions of the dimensions associated with the granular base facts. This way, the aggregated dimension tables should conform to the base dimension tables.

== Performance ==
In 1996, Ralph Kimball, who is widely regarded as one of the original architects of data warehousing, stated:

The single most dramatic way to affect performance in a large data warehouse is to provide a proper set of aggregate (summary) records that coexist with the primary base records. Aggregates can have a very significant effect on performance, in some cases speeding queries by a factor of one hundred or even one thousand. No other means exist to harvest such spectacular gains.

== Complexity ==
Having aggregates and atomic data increases the complexity of the dimensional model. This complexity should be transparent to the users of the data warehouse, thus when a request is made, the data warehouse should return data from the table with the correct grain. So when requests to the data warehouse are made, aggregate navigator functionality should be implemented, to help determine the correct table with the correct grain. The number of possible aggregations is determined by every possible combination of dimension granularities. Since it would produce a lot of overhead to build all possible aggregations, it is a good idea to choose a subset of tables on which to make aggregations. The best way to choose this subset and decide which aggregations to build is to monitor queries and design aggregations to match query patterns.

== Aggregate navigation ==
Having aggregate data in the dimensional model makes the environment more complex. To make this extra complexity transparent to the user, functionality known as aggregate navigation is used to query the dimensional and fact tables with the correct grain level. The aggregate navigation essentially examines the query to see if it can be answered using a smaller, aggregate table.

Implementations of aggregate navigators can be found in a range of technologies:

- OLAP engines
- Materialized views
- Relational OLAP (ROLAP) services
- BI application servers or query tools

It is generally recommended to use either of the first three technologies, since the benefits in the latter case is restricted to a single front end BI tool

== Challenges ==
- Since dimensional models only gain from aggregates on large data sets, it should be considered at what size of the data sets one should start using aggregates
- One can also ask oneself if a data warehouse always handles data sets that are too large for direct queries, or if it sometimes is a good idea to omit the aggregate tables when starting a new data warehouse project
- An open question is whether omitting aggregates in the first iteration of building a new data warehouse will make the structure of the dimensional model simpler
