= Interactive Compilation Interface =

Plugin API for compilers

Interactive Compilation Interface (ICI)
- Developer(s): Grigori Fursin
- Initial release: 2007; 18 years ago
- Stable release: 2.0.1 (development discontinued after this project was integrated with the GNU_Compiler_Collection) / May 29, 2009
- Written in: C++
- Operating system: Linux, Mac OS X, Microsoft Windows, Android
- Type: Optimizing_compiler, Interfaces, Plug-in_(computing), API
- License: GNU_General_Public_License
- Website: sourceforge.net/projects/gcc-ici

The Interactive Compilation Interface (ICI) is a plugin system with a high-level compiler-independent and low-level compiler-dependent API to transform production compilers into interactive research toolsets. It was developed by Grigori Fursin during the MILEPOST project. The ICI framework acts as a "middleware" interface between the compiler and the user-definable plugins. It opens up and reuses the production-quality compiler infrastructure to enable program analysis and instrumentation, fine-grain program optimizations, simple prototyping of new development and research ideas while avoiding building new compilation tools from scratch. For example, it is used in MILEPOST GCC to automate compiler and architecture design and program optimizations based on statistical analysis and machine learning, and predict profitable optimization to improve program execution time, code size and compilation time.

== Developments ==
ICI is now available in mainline GCC since version 4.5

ICI was extended during the Google Summer of Code'2009 to enable fine-grain program optimizations including polyhedral transformations, function level run-time adaptation and collective optimization.
