= Statistical Abstract of the United States =

Former publication of the US Census Bureau

The Statistical Abstract of the United States was a publication of the United States Census Bureau, an agency of the United States Department of Commerce. Published annually from 1878 to 2011, the statistics described social, political and economic conditions in the United States.

The Census Bureau ceased publication with the 2012 edition, released in August 2011; the Bureau stopped compiling the data for the Statistical Compendia program, including the Abstract and supplemental publications, on October 1, 2011.

In preparation for the Fiscal Year 2012 (FY 2012) budget, the Census Bureau did a comprehensive review of a number of programs and had to make difficult proposals to terminate and reduce a number of existing programs in order to acquire funds for higher priority programs. The decision to propose the elimination of this program was not made lightly. To access the most current data, please refer to the organizations cited in the source notes for each table of the Statistical Abstract.

A Washington Post columnist, Robert J. Samuelson, wrote "This is a mighty big loss for a mighty small saving." The agency’s 2012 budget would eliminate the Statistical Compendia Branch, which compiles the Statistical Abstract and other publications (such as the “County and City Data Book”). This would save $2.9 million and cut 24 jobs. Both the book and online versions of the Statistical Abstract would vanish. The American Library Association, representing about 16,700 public libraries and more than 100,000 academic and school libraries, is arguing to keep the Statistical Abstract. Alesia McManus, library director at Howard Community College in Columbia, started a Facebook page and launched a petition dedicated to reversing the decision, wrote Samuelson. He quoted one librarian as writing “If the library were on fire, this would be the reference book I would try and save first”, and another as saying “[The] Statistical Abstract has for years been one of the top five reference books used by students and faculty at South Dakota State University.” Samuelson said he didn't think the librarians' protest would have much effect.

Joseph Dionne and Paul Krugman published columns agreeing with Samuelson.

ProQuest continued the series, in co-operation with Bernan Press. The list price of the 2012 Department of Commerce edition was $20 (paperback), free online. The list price of the Proquest edition is $199.

In 1975, a Bicentennial Edition, Historical Statistics of the United States, Colonial Times to 1970, in two volumes, was published.

The 2010 (129th Edition) Statistical Abstract of the United States has 30 sections, 926 pages, and more than 1,300 tables, covering more than 200 topics, including income and wealth, imports and exports, agriculture, energy production and consumption, natural resources, and some international comparisons. All information is downloadable in PDF and Excel spreadsheet formats. The statistical abstract is the standard summary of statistics on the social, political, and economic organization of the United States. It is also designed to serve as a guide to other statistical publications and sources.

== Abbreviated section contents and appendixes ==
Sec. 1. Population (Tables 1−77)

Sec. 2. Births, Deaths, Marriages, and Divorces (Tables 78−126)

Sec. 3. Health and Nutrition (Tables 127−213)

Sec. 4. Education (Tables 214−294)

Sec. 5. Law Enforcement, Courts, and Prisons (Tables 295−345)

Sec. 6. Geography and Environment (Tables 346−384)

Sec. 7. Elections (Tables 385−415)

Sec. 8. State and Local Government Finances and Employment (Tables 416−456)

Sec. 9. Federal Government Finances and Employment (Tables 457−490)

Sec. 10. National Security and Veterans Affairs (Tables 491−525)

Sec. 11. Social Insurance and Human Services (Tables 526−573)

Sec. 12. Labor Force, Employment, and Earnings (Tables 574−650)

Sec. 13. Income, Expenditures, Poverty, and Wealth (Tables 651−707)

Sec. 14. Prices (Tables 708−727)

Sec. 15. Business Enterprise (Tables 728−774)

Sec. 16. Science and Technology (Tables 775−799)

Sec. 17. Agriculture (Tables 800−847)

Sec. 18. Forestry, Fishing, and Mining (Tables 848−887)

Sec. 19. Energy and Utilities (Tables 888−925)

Sec. 20. Construction and Housing (Tables 926−971)

Sec. 21. Manufactures (Tables 972−1007)

Sec. 22. Wholesale and Retail Trade (Tables 1008−1028)

Sec. 23. Transportation (Tables 1029−1090)

Sec. 24. Information and Communications (Tables 1091−1124)

Sec. 25. Banking, Finance, and Insurance (Tables 1125−1190)

Sec. 26. Arts, Recreation, and Travel (Tables 1191−1235)

Sec. 27. Accommodation, Food Services, and Other Services (Tables 1236−1249)

Sec. 28. Foreign Commerce and Aid (Tables 1250−1276)

Sec. 29. Puerto Rico and the Island Areas (Tables 1277−1292)

Sec. 30. International Statistics (Tables 1293−1369)

Appendix I. Guides to Sources of Statistics, State Statistical Abstracts and Foreign Statistical Abstracts

Appendix II. Metropolitan and Micropolitan Statistical Areas: Concepts, Components, and Population

Appendix III. Limitations of the Data

Appendix IV. Weights and Measures

Appendix V. Tables Deleted From the 2009 Edition of the Statistical Abstract

== Supplements ==
Two specialized data series issued irregularly by the Census Bureau constitute Statistical Abstract supplements:

- County and City Data Book - formed by merger of a 1944 Cities Supplement to the Abstract and a 1947 County Data Book, began publication in 1949 with the latest edition being the 14th (2007).
- State and Metropolitan Area Data Book - began publication in 1979 with the latest edition being the 7th (2010).
