= International Conference on Conceptual Modeling =

Annual conference series on entity-relationship modelling

The International Conference on Conceptual Modeling (short name: ER) is an annual research conference computer science dedicated to information and conceptual modeling. Since the first event in 1979 in Los Angeles, California, USA, the conference has evolved into one of the major forums for research on conceptual modeling and information retrieval.

The International Conference on Conceptual Modeling is ranked A by CORE

Conceptual modeling is about describing the semantics of software applications at a high level of abstraction. Specifically, conceptual modelers (1) describe structure models in terms of entities, relationships, and constraints; (2) describe behavior or functional models in terms of states, transitions among states, and actions performed in states and transitions; and (3) describe interactions and user interfaces in terms of messages sent and received and information exchanged. In their typical usage, conceptual-model diagrams are high-level abstractions that enable clients and analysts to understand one another, enable analysts to communicate successfully with application programmers, and in some cases automatically generate (parts of) the software application.

== Topics ==
- Entity-relationship model
- Entity-relationship diagram
- Conceptual schema design
- Model-driven software development
- Model-driven architecture (MDA)
- Unified Modeling Language (UML)
- Extended or enhanced entity–relationship model
- Object-role modeling
- Process modeling
- Business process modeling
- Workflow design
- Foundational theory of conceptual models and conceptual modeling

== Peter Chen Award ==
Initiated by Elsevier in 2008 to celebrate the 25th anniversary of the journal, Data and Knowledge Engineering, the Peter P. Chen Award honors one person each year for his or her outstanding contributions to the field of conceptual modeling. From 2009 to 2012, the winner received a plaque and check for $1000 by the ER Institute. Starting in 2013, the winner receives a check for $2500 donated by Elsevier. The award will be announced and presented at the ER Conference. The selection process is done according to the following four criteria:

- Research: how well the nominee has helped advance the field of conceptual modeling with his/her intellectual contributions.
- Service: participation in the organization of conceptual-modeling-related meetings and conferences and participation in editorial boards of conceptual-modeling-related journals.
- Education: how effectively the nominee has mentored doctoral students in conceptual modeling, produced researchers from their labs, and helped mentor other young people in the field.
- Contribution to practice: the extent to which the nominee has contributed to technology transfer, commercialization, and industrial projects.
- International reputation: the extent to which the nominee's work is visible to and has diffused into the international community.

=== Previous winners of the Peter P. Chen Award ===
- 2021: Sudha Ram
- 2020: Matthias Jarke
- 2019: Eric Yu
- 2018: Veda C. Storey
- 2017: Yair Wand
- 2016: Oscar Pastor
- 2015: Il-Yeol Song
- 2014: Antônio Luz Furtado
- 2013: Carlo Batini
- 2012: Stefano Spaccapietra
- 2011: Tok Wang Ling]]
- 2010: John Mylopoulos
- 2009: David W. Embley
- 2008: Bernhard Thalheim

== ER Fellows ==
The ER Fellows Award is an honor given to selected individuals in the conceptual-modeling community in recognition of their contributions to ER research, ER education, and ER community service. Since the annual ER conference is the flagship conference for the conceptual-modeling community, special consideration is given to candidates who have a sustained publication record in the conference proceedings, a record of encouraging students and others they mentor to become actively involved in the conference, and strong involvement in and service to the conference such as serving as a PC co-chair, conference chair, or steering-committee chair. Notwithstanding this intentional bias, ER Fellows may be selected from the broader community when they have clearly made significant research, education, and service contributions to conceptual modeling and continue to be actively involved in ER-community affairs.

=== Previous ER Fellows ===
- 2021: Jacky Akoka
- 2021: Carson Woo
- 2020: José Palazzo Moreira de Oliveira
- 2020: Stefano Rizzi
- 2019: Nicola Guarino
- 2019: Juan Carlos Trujillo
- 2018: Stephen W. Liddle
- 2018: Jeffrey Parsons
- 2017: Maurizio Lenzerini
- 2017: Peter Scheuermann
- 2016: Lois Delcambre
- 2016: Paul Johannesson
- 2015: Carlo Batini
- 2015: Paolo Atzeni
- 2014: Yair Wand
- 2013: Heinrich C. Mayr
- 2013: Veda C. Storey
- 2012: Jean-Luc Hainaut
- 2012: Il-Yeol Song
- 2011: Hannu Kangassalo
- 2011: John Mylopoulos
- 2010: Antoni Olivé
- 2010: Oscar Pastor
- 2010: Arne Sølvberg
- 2009: Peter P. Chen
- 2009: David W. Embley
- 2009: Tok Wang Ling
- 2009: Sudha Ram
- 2009: Stefano Spaccapietra
- 2009: Bernhard Thalheim

== Locations ==
Location history from DBLP:

- ER 2025: 44th International Conference, ER 2025, Poitiers, France, October 20–23, 2025
- ER 2019: 38th International Conference, ER 2019, Salvador, Bahia, Brazil, November 4–7, 2019
- ER 2018: 37th International Conference, ER 2018, Xi'an, China, October 22–25, 2018
- ER 2017: 36th International Conference, ER 2017, Valencia, Spain, November 6–9, 2017
- ER 2016: 35th International Conference on Conceptual Modeling, Gifu, Japan, Nov. 14-17, 2016
- 33rd International Conference, ER 2014, Atlanta, GA, USA, October 27–29, 2014
- ER 2013: Hong Kong, P.R. China
- ER 2012: Florence, Italy
- ER 2011: Brussels, Belgium
- ER 2010: Vancouver, Canada
- ER 2009: Gramado, Brazil
- ER 2008: Barcelona, Spain
- ER 2007: Auckland, New Zealand
- ER 2006: Tucson, Arizona, USA
- ER 2005: Klagenfurt, Austria
- ER 2004: Shanghai, China
- ER 2003: Chicago, Illinois, USA
- ER 2002: Tampere, Finland
- ER 2001: Yokohama, Japan
- ER 2000: Salt Lake City, Utah, USA
- ER 1999: Paris, France
- ER 1998: Singapore
- ER 1997: Los Angeles, California, USA
- ER 1996: Cottbus, Germany
- ER 1995: Gold Coast, Australia
- ER 1994: Manchester, UK
- ER 1993: Arlington, Texas, USA
- ER 1992: Karlsruhe, Germany
- ER 1991: San Mateo, California, USA
- ER 1990: Lausanne, Switzerland
- ER 1989: Toronto, Canada
- ER 1988: Rome, Italy
- ER 1987: New York, USA:
- ER 1986: Dijon, France
- ER 1985: Chicago, Illinois, USA
- ER 1983: Anaheim, California, USA
- ER 1981: Washington, DC, USA
- ER 1979: Los Angeles, California, USA
