= Peter P. Chen Award =

Annual conceptual modeling award

- Awarded for: For outstanding contributions to the field of conceptual modeling
- Presented by: Elsevier
- First award: 2008
- Website: Peter P. Chen Award

Peter P. Chen Award is an annually presented award to honor one individual for their contributions to the field of conceptual modeling. Named after the computer scientist Peter Chen, the award was started in 2008 by the publisher Elsevier as a means of celebrating the 25th anniversary of the journal Data & Knowledge Engineering. It is presented at the Entity Relationship (ER) International Conference on Conceptual Modeling. Winners are given a plaque, a cash prize (up to US$5,000), and are invited to give a keynote speech.

There are five criteria for selecting the winner; research, how the nominee has contributed to advance the field of conceptual modeling; service, organizational contributions for related meetings, conferences, and editorial boards; education, mentoring of doctoral students in the field; contribution to practice, contributions to technology transfer, commercialization, and industrial projects; and international reputation. The selection committee is composed of five members: the Steering Committee chair, two Program Committee members appointed by the Steering Committee chair, and the recipients of the last two years.

== Laureates ==
Year	Laureate	Institution
2008	Bernhard Thalheim	Kiel University, Germany
2009	David W. Embley	Brigham Young University, USA
2010	John Mylopoulos	University of Trento, Italy
2011	Tok Wang Ling	National University of Singapore, Singapore
2012	Stefano Spaccapietra	École Polytechnique Fédérale de Lausanne, Switzerland
2013	Carlo Batini	University of Milano-Bicocca, Italy
2014	Antonio Luz Furtado	Pontificia Univ. Catolica do Rio de Janeiro, Brazil
2015	Il-Yeol Song	Drexel University, USA
2016	Óscar Pastor	Technical University of Valencia, Spain
2017	Yair Wand	UBC Sauder School of Business, University of British Columbia, Canada
2018	Veda C. Storey	Georgia State University, USA
2019	Eric Yu	University of Toronto, Canada
2020	Matthias Jarke	RWTH Aachen University, Germany
2021	Sudha Ram	University of Arizona, USA
2022	Maurizio Lenzerini	Università di Roma La Sapienza, Italy
2023	Nicola Guarino	Italy
2024	Heinrich Christian Mayr	Alpen-Adria-Universität Klagenfurt, Austria
2025	Ron Weber	University of Queensland, Australia
2026	Terry Halpin	Australia
