= Calvanese =

Calvanese is an Italian surname. Notable people with the surname include:

- Diego Calvanese (born 1966), Italian computer scientist and professor
- Flora Calvanese (born 1954), Italian politician
- Francesco Calvanese (1947–2025), Italian politician
