= Workshop on Information Technologies and Systems =

The Workshop on Information Technologies and Systems - WITS. is an academic conference for information systems that is held annually in December in conjunction with ICIS (the International Conference on Information Systems). WITS is quantitatively/technically-oriented and is primarily attended by business school professors from leading academic research institutions in North America with growing participation from throughout the world. WITS is incorporated in the state of Georgia (US).

== Origins ==
Richard Wang (MIT) and Sudha Ram (University of Arizona) started WITS in 1991. They co-chaired the first conference held in Boston on December 14–15, 1991. Also involved in the early conferences were Sal March (Vanderbilt University), Prabuddha De (Purdue University), Al Hevner (University of South Florida), Stuart Madnick (MIT), Veda Storey (Georgia State University), Diane Strong (Worcester Polytechnic Institute), Andrew Whinston (University of Texas at Austin), Carson Woo (University of British Columbia), and others.

== WITS Presidents ==
- 2019-2021: Amit Basu, (Southern Methodist University), USA.
- 2016-2018: Ram Gopal, (University of Connecticut), USA.
- 2013-2015: Sumit Sarkar, (University of Texas at Dallas), USA.
- 2010–2012: Jeffrey Parsons, (Memorial University of Newfoundland), Canada.
- 2007–2009: Paulo Goes, (University of Arizona), USA.
- 2004–2006: Carson Woo, (University of British Columbia), Canada.
- 2001–2003: Sal March,(Vanderbilt University), USA.
- 1998–2000: Prabuddha De, (Purdue University), USA.
- 1995–1997: Richard Wang, (Massachusetts Institute of Technology), USA.

== WITS Locations and Conference Chairs ==
- WITS 2019: Munich, Germany— Martin Bichler (Technical University of Munich) & Wolfgang Ketter (University of Cologne)
- WITS 2018: Santa Clara, California, USA— Kaushik Dutta (University of South Florida) & Zhengrui (Jeffrey) Jiang (Iowa State University)
- WITS 2017: Seoul, South Korea— Raghu Santanam (Arizona State University) & Victoria Yoon (Virginia Commonwealth University)
- WITS 2016: Dublin, Ireland— Wolfgang Ketter (Erasmus University) & Balaji Padmanabhan (University of South Florida)
- WITS 2015: Dallas, USA— Varghese Jacob (University of Texas at Dallas) & Subodha Kumar (Texas A&M University)
- WITS 2014: Auckland, New Zealand— Yong Tan (University of Washington) & Arvind Tripathi (University of Kansas)
- WITS 2013: Milano, Italy— Raj Sharman (University at Buffalo) & Sandeep Purao (Pennsylvania State University)
- WITS 2012: Orlando, Florida — Haldun Aytug (University of Florida) & Jackie Rees Ulmer (Purdue University)
- WITS 2011: Shanghai, China – Roger Chiang (University of Cincinnati) & Andrew Gemino (Simon Fraser University)
- WITS 2010: St. Louis, Missouri — Erik Rolland & Raymond A. Patterson (University of Calgary)
- WITS 2009: Phoenix, Arizona — Huimin Zhao, (University of Wisconsin-Milwaukee) & Vijay Khatri, (Indiana University)
- WITS 2008: Paris, France — Ram Gopal (University of Connecticut) & Ram Ramesh (University of Buffalo )
- WITS 2007: Montreal, Canada — Kaushal Chari (University of South Florida) & Akhil Kumar (Pennsylvania State University)
- WITS 2006: Milwaukee, Wisconsin — Ramesh Venkataraman, (Indiana University) & Atish Sinha
- WITS 2005: Las Vegas, Nevada – Kar Yan Tam & J. Leon Zhao
- WITS 2004: Washington, DC – Paulo Goes, (University of Arizona) & Amitava Dutta
- WITS 2003: Seattle, Washington – Deb Dey (University of Washington) & Ramayya Krishnan (Carnegie Mellon University)
- WITS 2002: Barcelona, Spain – Amit Basu (Southern Methodist University) & Soumitra Dutta
- WITS 2001: New Orleans, LA — Jeffrey Parsons, (Memorial University of Newfoundland) & Olivia Sheng
- WITS 2000: Brisbane, Australia – Paul Bowen and Vijay Mookerjee, (University of Texas at Dallas)
- WITS 1999: Charlotte, North Carolina — Sridhar Narasimhan, (Georgia Institute of Technology) & Sumit Sarkar, (University of Texas at Dallas)
- WITS 1998: Helsinki, Finland – Janis Bubenko and Sal March,(Vanderbilt University)
- WITS 1997: Atlanta, Georgia – Arie Segev & Vijay K. Vaishnavi
- WITS 1996: Cleveland, Ohio — Arun Sen (Texas A&M University) & George Ernst
- WITS 1995: Amsterdam, the Netherlands – Sudha Ram, (University of Arizona) and Matthias Jarke
- WITS 1994: Vancouver, BC, Canada — Prabuddha De, (Purdue University) & Carson Woo
- WITS 1993: Orlando, Florida – Al Hevner & Nabil Kamel
- WITS 1992: Dallas, Texas — Andrew Whinston (University of Texas at Austin) & Veda Storey
- WITS 1991: Cambridge, MA — Richard Wang, (Massachusetts Institute of Technology) & Sudha Ram, (University of Arizona)
