= Collection development =

Process of accruing library materials

Library collection development is the process of systematically building the collection of a particular library to meet the information needs of the library users (a service population) in a timely and economical manner using information resources locally held as well as resources from other organizations. "According to (Evans & Zamosky) is a dynamic self perpetuating cycle or process and consists of six definable stages, namely community analysis, selection policies, selection, acquisition, weeding and evaluation.

According to the International Federation of Library Associations and Institutions (IFLA), acquisition and collection development focuses on methodological and topical themes pertaining to acquisition of print and other analogue library materials (by purchase, exchange, gift, legal deposit), and the licensing and purchase of electronic information resources. Collection development involves activities that need a librarian or information professional who is specialized in improving the library's collection. The process includes the selection of information materials that respond to the users or patrons need as well as de-selection of unwanted information materials, called weeding. It also involves the planning strategies for continuing acquisition, evaluation of new information materials and the existing collection in order to determine how well a particular library serves its users.

== Process ==
Collection development is a continuous process comprising six elements or stages:

1. User needs analysis
2. Policies development
3. Selection
4. Acquisition
5. Weeding
6. Evaluation

== User needs analysis ==
User needs analysis is the process of learning more about a target population/ patrons with a view to identifying their information needs. Hence, this concept can also be referred to as community analysis, user studies, information needs analysis, needs assessment and/or information audit. The following factors should be taken into consideration when doing the user analysis; available funds, number and qualifications of available staff, the depth and breadth of the study. However, there are options of choosing who can do the study; an institution can choose or hire people that can do the information needs analysis using qualified experienced consultant or constituting a committee comprising own members of staff and either the combination of the two mentioned.

Therefore, there are several advantages of hiring a qualified and experienced consultant for the following reasons;

The study will be done in a professional manner, the option will ensure completion of the study in good time, there will be no interruption of services as staff will be free to perform their normal duties.

== Policy ==
The development and implementation of a collection development policy is a best practices for libraries and archives, and addresses issues such as:

- material selection and acquisition
- replacement of worn or lost materials
- removal (weeding) of materials no longer needed in the collection
- planning for new collections or collection areas
- institutional mission
- cooperative decision-making with other libraries or within library consortia

According to the IFLA there are four primary reasons for a written collection development policy: selection, planning, public relations, and the wider context. A written selection guidelines provide staff with the tools to access and evaluate potential additional collection materials as well as basis for denying the acceptance of materials. Beyond the addition of new materials this section can also define the parameters for weeding materials, storage standards, and preservation of unstable collection objects. Secondly, planning aids in making decisions for future improvement in library infrastructure and proper distribution of funds for the institution. Thirdly, in the current environment of limited funding and competition between departments and agencies, a written collection policy aids in the library's public relations. This document can be a tool to help potential donors or funders assess the needs of the library, including assets and services. Lastly, in terms of the wider context, the document can aid in collaboration with other institutions in an effort to fulfill the needs of their patrons and community. Each institution will have a better understanding of the plans for each and how they can assist each other in achieving these goals.

== Weeding ==
Weeding also known as de-selection of information materials is a planned and systematic practice of discarding or transferring to storage, excess copies and rarely-used books and materials. It also involve removal of library material from the collections based on some determined conditions.

Historically, both patrons and other librarians criticize weeding books. Some believe libraries should keep all materials in circulation no matter the condition or need for room in the facility for newer material. The controversial nature of collection weeding necessitates the educating of library staff. It provides them with "the tools they need to counter common perceptions or misperceptions regarding weeding", especially those encountered from faculty in an academic library. Educating the staff with workshops and presentations on collection quality, maintenance and the importance and positive benefits of weeding the collection are important components for a library to consider.

== Collection evaluation methods ==
Some library evaluation methods include the checklists method, circulation and interlibrary loan statistics, citation analysis, network usage analysis, vendor-supplied statistics and faculty opinion. Therefore, without an ongoing weeding program, a collection can quickly age and become difficult to use.

However, in order to have a continuous weeding program, a method called continuous review, evaluation and weeding is used. This method makes it easier to routinely remove outdated and unused materials from the collection while also learning where the collection has gaps or it needs new items.

=== Selection vs. censorship ===
When acquiring new materials for a library's collection, it can be difficult to differentiate between selection and censorship. The American Library Association speaks of collections development as selecting materials that are desired by the community as well as fulfilling other educational and recreational criteria. The organization comments that a librarian should not purposely omit the purchase of books or other items due to them being controversial in nature, the author's religious or political views, or the librarian's personal beliefs. From the ALA website, they continue the argument by stating that, "Libraries should provide materials and information presenting all points of view on current and historical issues. Materials should not be proscribed or removed because of partisan or doctrinal disapproval."

=== Checklists method ===
This method of collection evaluation is the practice of checking a library collection against a list of notable books or materials to see if the collection includes these titles. This is the oldest method of collection evaluation, and its first recorded use occurs in 1849 by Charles Coffin Jewett at the Smithsonian Institution.

=== Citation analysis ===
Citation analysis is the method most used on the college and university level. This method looks at frequently used citations from bibliographies, indexes, and references to see if the resources used are included in the learning institute's partner library. The purpose is to see if the written work produced can be done using only the library located at the college or university. Citation analysis is a good research method to use in academic libraries on the university and college level when performing a collections evaluation. This method is performed by studying bibliographies from many sources such as student papers, faculty research publications, along with theses and dissertations. This information is then used to see what percentage of the items cited in the bibliographies have come from the academic library's collection. Citation analysis is used to see if the work produced at the university or college has been written using sources mainly from the academic library at that learning institution.

=== Collections grid ===
The collections grid is a model to discuss items in a collection in terms of their uniqueness, and the amount of care or stewardship they attract. For example, rare books and local history materials are held in few libraries and attract much care as the jewels of a collection, whereas books and DVDs are held in many libraries and do not attract as much care.

== Journals ==
Academic journals about collection development include:

- Against The Grain
- Collection Management
- Collection and Curation (formerly Collection Building)
- Journal of Electronic Resources Librarianship (formerly Acquisitions Librarian)
- Library Collections, Acquisitions & Technical Services (formerly Library Acquisitions: Practice and Theory)
- The Serials Librarian

== See also ==
- Electronic resource management § Data analysis
- Library management
- Patron-driven acquisition
