= Oscar Pastor =

Oscar Pastor may refer to:

- Oscar Rolando Cantuarias Pastor (1931–2011), Roman Catholic archbishop of Piura, Peru
- Óscar Pastor (computer scientist) (born 1962), Spanish computer scientist
