= Patron-driven acquisition =

Library collection development model

Patron-driven acquisition (PDA), also referred to as demand-driven acquisition (DDA), is a model of library collection development in which a library only purchases materials when it is clear that a patron wants them. In an ideal transaction, libraries provide the patron with access to search engines, academic databases and/or library catalogs from which the patron can request items. When certain thresholds are reached for an item (e.g., number of pages read or number of requests), the library purchases the item and delivers instant access to patrons. The library may acquire the resource permanently, or acquire a license to use the resource only at certain times or in certain ways. Since content purchased is in digital format, "PDA emphasizes collecting for and at the moment of need" instead of collecting with a long-term focus.

PDA is frequently associated with e-book collections, although print and hybrid PDA options also exist. There are several benefits to focusing this practice on the use of digital content: delivery is instantaneous; e-books require no physical space, which requires specific costs to maintain; libraries can afford patron access when they might not be able to afford to buy materials, increasing the collection's ability; and purchases are guaranteed usage, which is an important consideration when purchasing materials.

== Interfaces ==
Libraries typically index ebooks that are available for purchase in their catalogs or discovery layers. Libraries may limit their indexing to items with certain pricing, available licensing options, topics, publishers, and/or to items that the library does not already make available in a different format.

Some libraries choose a PDA interface in which patrons are unaware that they are causing an ebook to be purchased, to avoid purchases that are not immediately needed and to encourage patrons who would not otherwise initiate a purchase. The University of Iowa reported that this type of system, when unmediated by library collection development staff, can lead to a very high level of purchases.
