= Bernhard Thalheim =

German computer scientist (born 1952)

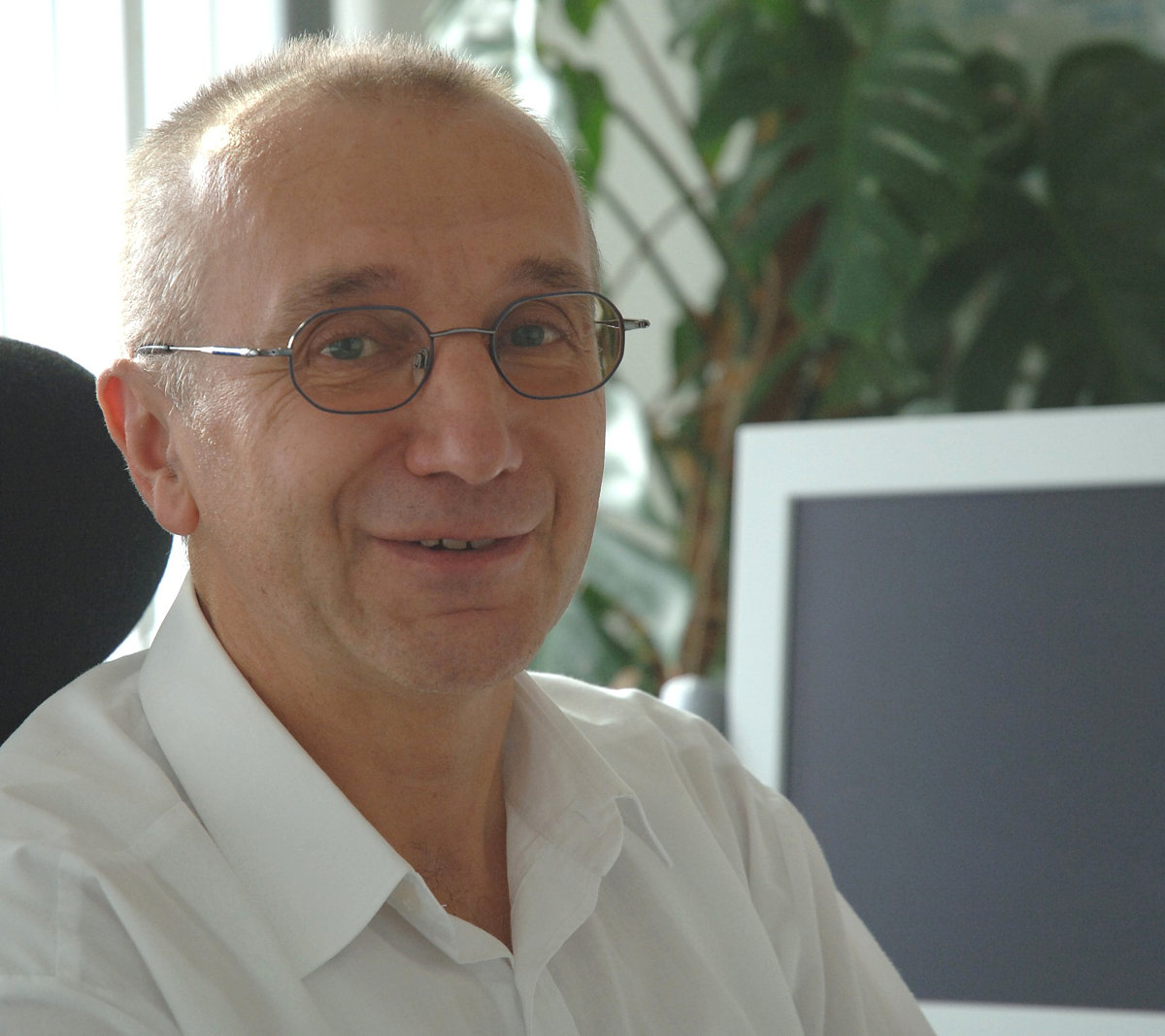
- Born: Bernhard Karl Thalheim; 10 March 1952 (age 74); Radebeul, East Germany
- Education: Dresden University of Technology; Lomonosov Moscow State University
- Known for: Conceptual modeling and its theoretical foundation
- Awards: Peter P. Chen Award of Elsevier for Entity-Relationship Model Research
- Scientific career
- Fields: Computer science
- Workplaces: Christian-Albrechts-Universität; Lomonosov Moscow State University; Brandenburg Technical University; University of Rostock; Dresden University of Technology
- Website: Official website

Bernhard Karl Thalheim (born 10 March 1952 in Radebeul) is a German computer scientist and professor of information systems engineering at the University of Kiel in Kiel, Germany. He is known for his work on conceptual modeling and its theoretical foundational contributions.

== Biography ==
Born in Radebeul (near Dresden), Germany, Thalheim received his M.Sc. in mathematics and computer science in 1975 at the Dresden University of Technology, his PhD in discrete mathematics in 1979 at the Lomonosov Moscow State University, and his habilitation in theoretical computer science in 1985 at the Dresden University of Technology.

From 1986-89, he was an associate professor at the Dresden University of Technology. In 1989 he moved to the University of Rostock, where he was professor until 1993. From 1993 to 2003 he was dean and full professor at the Brandenburg Technical University, and since 2003 he is professor at the Christian-Albrechts-Universität of Kiel. Thalheim has been visiting professor at the Kuwait University; at the University of Klagenfurt, Austria; at the Alfréd Rényi Institute of Mathematics, Hungarian Academy of Sciences; and at Massey University at Palmerston North, New Zealand.

Thalheim has received a number of awards for his achievements in information systems engineering. He was honored in 2005 as the Kolmogorov Professor h.c. at Lomonosov Moscow State University, on 22 October 2008, received the Peter P. Chen Award of Elsevier for Entity–relationship model research, is the founder of the German Chapter of DAMA, international Vice-Chair of the steering committee of the FoIKS conferences, Member of steering committees of conferences, e.g. ER, ADBIS, ASM, NLDB Editor of Data and Knowledge Engineering and other journals, and member of the advisory board of Dataport.

== Work ==
=== Conceptual modeling ===
The foundational contributions to conceptual modeling theory and Science of Conceptual Modeling of Thalheim can be found at multiple levels and abstractions, such as:

- Higher Order Extended ER model,
- Dependencies in relational databases and
- Handbook of Conceptual Modeling, Chapter 4

With this work Thalheim contributed to the formalization and theoretical underpinning of conceptual modeling.

His ideas about conceptual modeling foundations and theory have been applied in field as:

- Semantics in databases for generalized functional dependencies for user-friendly database designing,
- Co-design as a holistic approach for collaboration and corporation in design of information systems applications,
- Micro, meso and macro levels of users work leading to the development of collaboration frameworks for distributed Web information systems,
- Conceptualization of theories in various application areas for the foundation of content management systems,
- Model suites as the design theory and foundation of multi-model engineering for handling information system models and their evolution complexities,
- Business process modeling and notations beyond business process modeling leading to database management foundations, and
- The systematic development of internet sites leading to Web information systems.

=== Other developments ===
- RADD : Rapid application and database development (toolbox for development of structures, constraints, functions, views and interfaces for database systems)
- VisualSQL : Visual database querying

== Publications ==
Bernhard Thalheim published several books, papers and articles.

=== Selected books ===
- 2011. Handbook of Conceptual Modeling: Theory, Practice, and Research Challenges. With David W. Embley(eds.), Springer ISBN 978-3642158643
- 2011. Semantics in Data and Knowledge Bases. With Klaus-Dieter Schewe (eds.), 4th International Workshops, SDKB 2010, Bordeaux, France, July 5, 2010, Revised Selected Papers Springer.
- 2010. Advances in Databases and Information Systems - 14th East European Conference. With Barbara Catania, and Mirjana Ivanovic (eds.), ADBIS 2010, Novi Sad, Serbia, September 20–24, Proceedings Springer.
- 2008. Semantics in Data and Knowledge Bases. With Klaus-Dieter Schewe (eds.), Third International Workshop, SDKB 2008, Nantes, France, March 29, 2008, Revised Selected Papers Springer.
- 2008. Web Information Systems Engineering - WISE 2008. With James Bailey, David Maier, Klaus-Dieter Schewe, and Xiaoyang Sean Wang (eds.), 9th International Conference, Auckland, New Zealand, September 1–3, 2008. Proceedings Springer.
- 2007. Conceptual Modeling - ER 2007. With Christine Parent, Klaus-Dieter Schewe, and Veda C. Storey (eds.), 26th International Conference on Conceptual Modeling, Auckland, New Zealand, November 5–9, 2007, Proceedings Springer.
- 2004. Abstract State Machines 2004. Advances in Theory and Practice. with Wolf Zimmermann(eds.) 11th International Workshop, ASM, Lutherstadt Wittenberg, Germany, May 24–28, 2004. Proceedings Springer,
- 2004. Web Information Systems. With Christoph Bussler, Suk-ki Hong, Woochun Jun, Roland Kaschek, Kinshuk, Shonali Krishnaswamy, Seng Wai Loke, Daniel Oberle, Debbie Richards, Amit Sharma, and York Sure (eds.), WISE 2004 International Workshops, Brisbane, Australia, November 22–24, 2004. Proceedings Springer.
- 2003. Semantics in Databases. With Leopoldo E. Bertossi, Gyula O. H. Katona, and Klaus-Dieter Schewe (eds.), Second International Workshop, Dagstuhl Castle, Germany, January 7–12, 2001, Revised Papers Springer.
- 2003. Advances in Databases and Information Systems. With Leonid A. Kalinichenko, Rainer Manthey, and Uwe Wloka (eds.),7th East European Conference, ADBIS 2003, Dresden, Germany, September 3–6, 2003, Proceedings Springer.
- 2000. Entity-Relationship Modeling Foundations of Database Technology. Springer, Berlin 2000, ISBN 3-540-65470-4.
- 2000. Current Issues in Databases and Information Systems, East-European Conference on Advances in Databases and Information Systems. With Julius Stuller, Jaroslav Pokorný, and Yoshifumi Masunaga (eds.), Held Jointly with International Conference on Database Systems for Advanced Applications, ADBIS-DASFAA 2000, Prague, Czech Republic, September 5–8, 2000, Proceedings Springer.
- 2000. Foundations of Information and Knowledge Systems. With Klaus-Dieter Schewe (eds.), First International Symposium, FoIKS 2000, Burg, Germany, February 14–17, 2000, Proceedings Springer.
- 1999. Conceptual Modeling: Current Issues and Future Directions (Lecture Notes in Computer Science) With Peter Chen, Jacky Akoka, and Hannu Kangassalo (eds.).
- 1991. Dependencies in relational databases. published by Teubner.
- 1989. Practical Database Design Methodologies. Kuwait University Press.

=== Articles ===
- 1984-2011: 316 publications, 23 main publications, 212 peer-reviewed publications, 81 other publications, 97 manuscripts, pre-prints, submitted and accepted papers
