= Weeding (library) =

Targeted removal of library items based on criteria

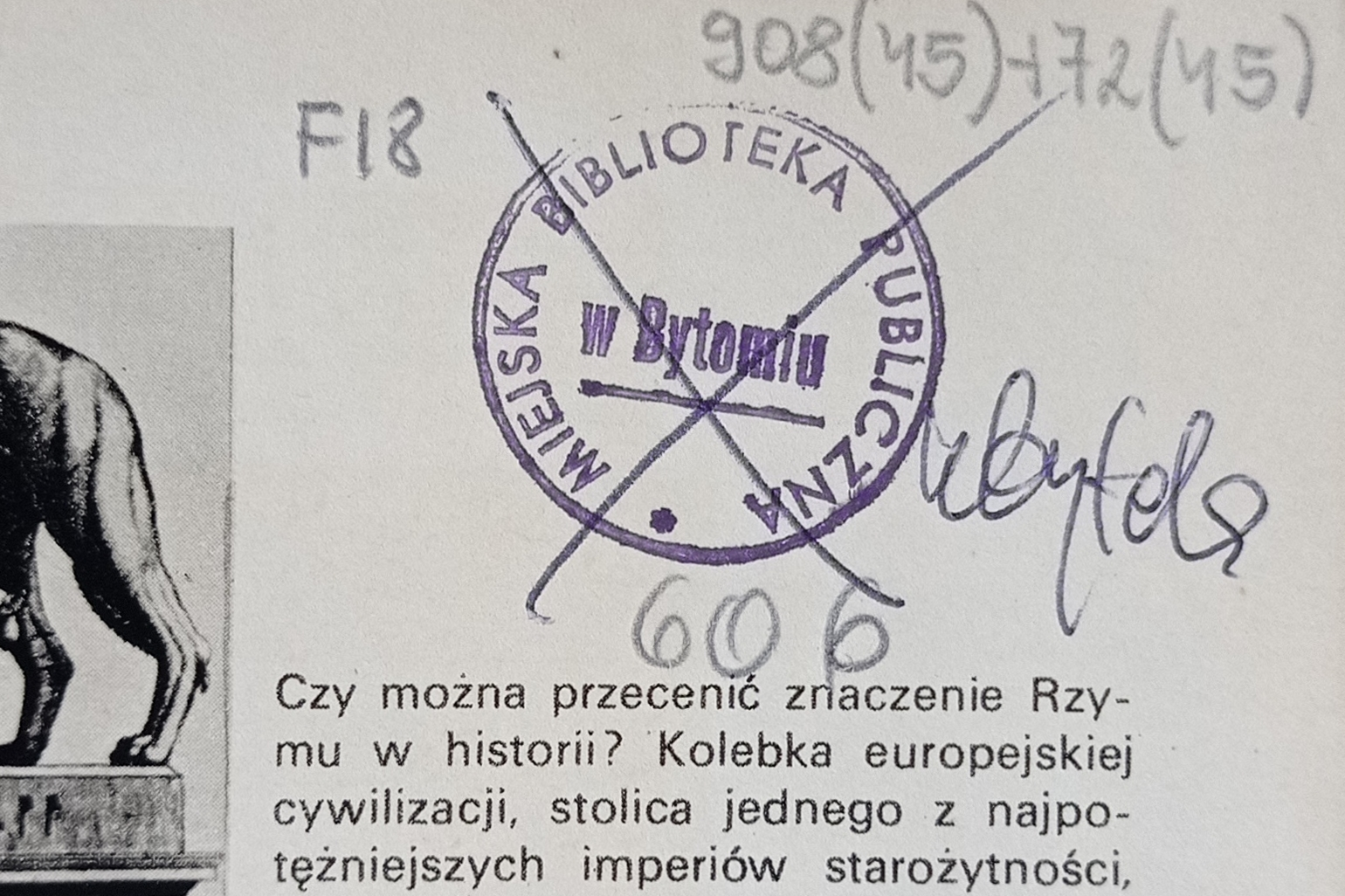
Weeded book – library stamp is crossed out

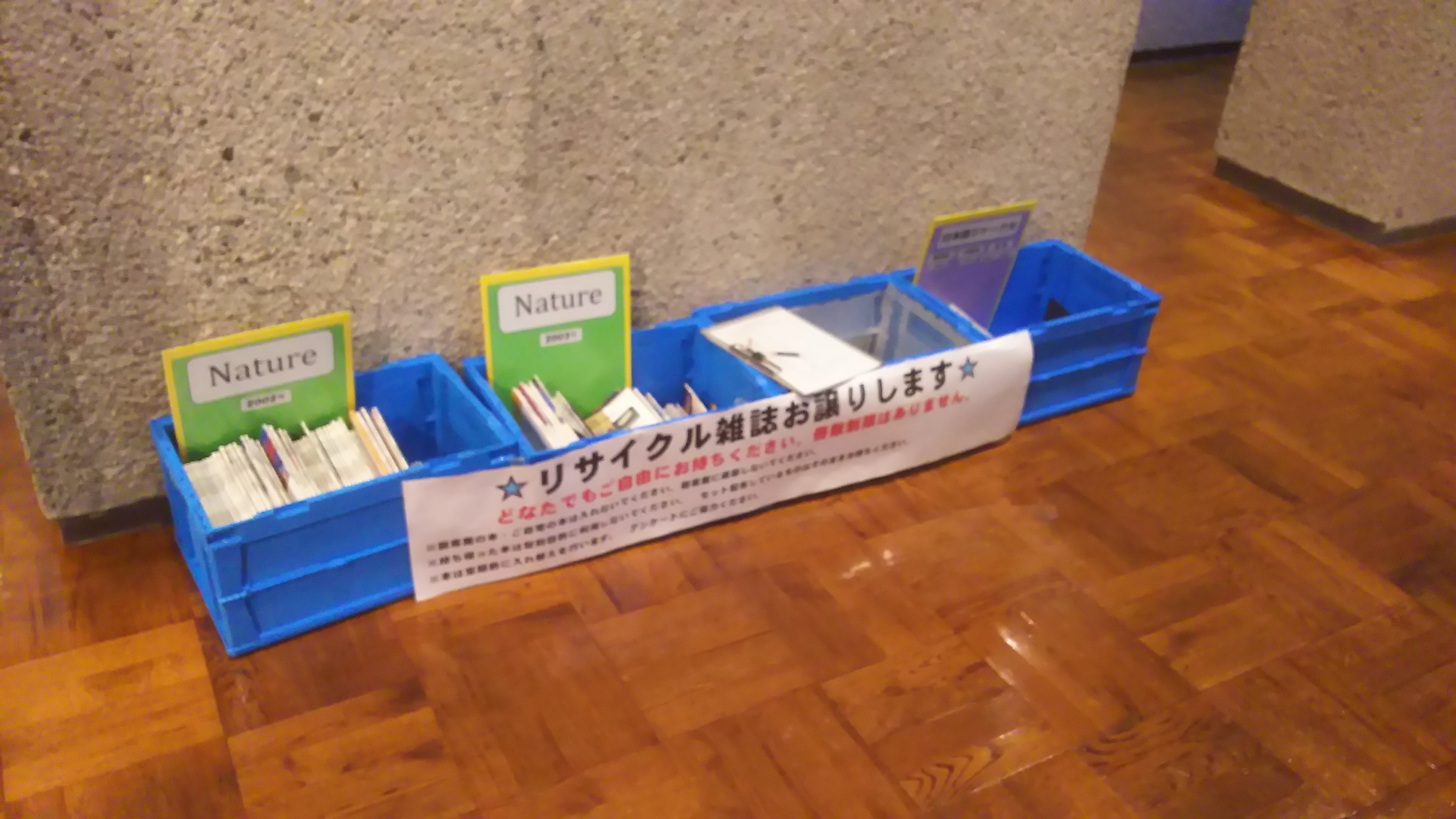
Weeded magazines in library

Weeding, also sometimes referred to as deaccession, is systematically removing resources from a library based on selected criteria. It is the opposite of selecting material for incorporation, though the selection and de-selection of material often involve the same thought process. Weeding is a vital process for an active collection because it ensures it stays current, relevant, and in good condition. Weeding should be continuous. Educating the staff with workshops and presentations on collection quality, maintenance, and the importance and positive benefits of weeding the collection are important components for a library to consider. Its development is a part of Collection development.

== Reasons to weed ==
A "well-maintained, well-pruned collection is far more useful than one filled with out-of-date or unused materials." Weeding a physical collection has many benefits:

- Space is preserved to add relevant materials.
- Patrons are able to access useful materials quickly and the librarian can direct them to information more easily.
- The collection is more reputable because it is current.
- The librarian can easily see the strengths and weaknesses of the collection.
- Materials are of good quality and in good physical condition.

With many collections having a digital component, space is not an issue. However, this does not mean digital collections should not be weeded. "Clearing out unused materials makes a patron's searching experience better by reducing the number of old and irrelevant records the patrons must wade through in their search results to find what they really want." The digital collection, like the physical collection, should be current and easily accessible.

== Weeding criteria ==
Weeding should be addressed in a library's collection development policy, and the criteria should be outlined. The following list outlines some considerations for weeding resources.

- Poor content
  - Content is outdated or obsolete.
  - Content is biased, racist, or sexist.
  - Content is irrelevant to patron needs (or not being used in a school's curriculum).
  - Content is too mature/immature for patrons (especially important for school libraries).
- Poor condition
  - Resource has irreparable damage (torn pages, broken spines).
  - Resource is dirty or smelly.
  - Resource would not survive further circulation.
- Poor circulation
  - Resource is not being used by patrons in a certain time frame.
- Other considerations
  - Multiple copies that are not needed.
  - Enough resources on a particular subject.
  - Replacement of the item and the cost of replacing it.
  - Visual appeal of the item (including artwork).

== Weeding issues ==
Weeding may be viewed as controversial by community members. John N. Berry III has discussed this in his essay, "The Weeding War". The controversial nature of collection weeding necessitates the educating of library staff. It provides them with "the tools they need to counter common perceptions or misperceptions regarding weeding", especially those encountered by faculty in an academic library. Communication with patrons and broader community is also an important part of addressing potential controversy or backlash to weeding. This can include giving detailed notice to the community for larger-scale weeding projects, for example, a statement on a library's website or in library publications like newsletters. For ongoing, gradual weeding, staff being prepared to explain deaccession in positive terms, such as making space for new books or renewing the collection, is likely to make the process more smooth.

Inconsistency in approach and lack of available time to commit to the weeding process are also concerns for many library workers in charge of deaccession. Individuals have found their weeding evaluation criteria changing throughout the process and needing to re-evaluate previous work, struggling to balance objectivity with potential emotional connections to the materials in the collection, and failing to complete other job tasks due to the extensive time and labor required.

Decisions around what to do with weeded materials also can be controversial, as the imagery of a large collection of books being disposed of can bring up concerns of censorship or waste. Choosing methods of disposal that allow for reuse, such as donating the materials, or recycling can create a more positive community reaction. If books must be completely disposed of without intentions of reuse, it must be clear to staff and community members that the books are unacceptable for use in one way or another.
