= Theodosios Pavlidis =

Greek-American computer scientist (born 1934)

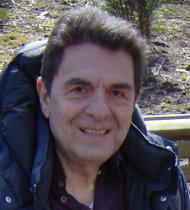
- Born: Theodosios Pavlidis; Greek: Θεοδόσιος Παυλίδης; September 8, 1934 (age 91); Thessaloniki, Greece
- Citizenship: United States
- Education: UC Berkeley; Athens Polytechnic
- Awards: King-Sun Fu Prize; IEEE Computer Society; Golden Core Award; IAPR Fellow; IEEE Computer Society; Meritorious Service Award; IEEE Fellow
- Scientific career
- Fields: Pattern Recognition; Image Processing; Computer Graphics; Machine Vision; Biomathematics
- Workplaces: Stony Brook University; Bell Labs; Princeton University
- Thesis: Analysis and Synthesis of Pulse Frequency Modulation Feedback Systems (1964)
- Doctoral advisor: Eliahu I. Jury
- Notable students: John Mylopoulos, Jianying Hu
- Website: www.theopavlidis.com

Theodosios Pavlidis (Greek: Θεοδόσιος Παυλίδης; born September 8, 1934) is a Greek-born computer scientist and Distinguished Professor Emeritus of Computer Science at the State University of New York, Stony Brook.

== Education ==
Pavlidis studied at the National Technical University of Athens, where in 1957 he received his Diploma in Mechanical and Electrical Engineering degree. He continued to study at the University of California, Berkeley, where he received his MS in Electrical Engineering in 1962 and his PhD in Electrical Engineering in 1964.

== Career ==
Pavlidis taught at Princeton University, starting as an assistant professor in 1964, promoted to associate professor in 1968 and full professor in 1975. In 1980, he joined AT&T Bell Laboratories in Murray Hill, New Jersey, as a Member of Technical Staff. While at Bell Labs, in 1982, he was appointed Senior Editor of the IEEE Transactions on Pattern Analysis and Machine Intelligence (PAMI) and held that position through 1986. Pavlidis resumed teaching in 1986, first as a Leading Professor, and then as a distinguished professor in 1995, becoming emeritus in 2001.

He conducted fundamental research in several computer software technology areas, including pattern recognition, image analysis, picture editing, OCR, computer vision, and barcodes. He contributed to the PDF417 two-dimensional barcode ISO standard, allowing for the barcode itself to have very high information density and error correction. His work in computer vision resulted in an algorithm that could scan barcodes that are poorly printed or defaced/dirty.

Pavlidis has published several books, and numerous articles and papers in leading engineering journals and conference proceedings. He is also a named inventor on 15 U.S. issued patents.

Additional aspects of Pavlidis' career may be found in the sidebar of his IAPR profile.

== Honors and awards ==
- 1979: Fellow of the IEEE
- 1986: IEEE Computer Society Meritorious Service Certificate for contributions as Editor-in-Chief of PAMI
- 1994: Fellow of the IAPR for contributions to computer graphics and image processing, and for service to the IAPR
- 1996: IEEE Computer Society Golden Core Award
- 2000: IAPR King-Sun Fu Prize for fundamental contributions to the theory and methodology of structural pattern recognition

== Books ==
- Biological Oscillators: Their Mathematical Analysis. Academic Press, 1973.
- Structural Pattern Recognition. Springer-Verlag, 1977.
- Algorithms for Graphics and Image Processing. Computer Science Press, 1982.
- Interactive Computer Graphics in X. PWS Publishing, 1995.
- Fundamentals of X Programming. Kluwer Academic/Plenum Publishers, 1999.
