= George H. Mealy =

American computer scientist

George H. Mealy (December 31, 1927 – June 21, 2010, in Scituate, Massachusetts) was an American mathematician and computer scientist who invented the namesake Mealy machine, a type of finite state transducer. He was also a pioneer of modular programming, one of the lead designers of the IPL-V programming language, and an early advocate of macro processors in assembly language programming.

Mealy went to Harvard University, where he was active in radio as business manager for WHRB. He graduated in 1951 with an A.B., and at that time began working for Bell Laboratories. He later worked at the RAND Corporation then IBM and taught at Harvard.

== Other contributions ==
In a 2024 article in Data & Knowledge Engineering, researchers described Mealy's 1967 paper "Another Look at Data" as containing the first mention of the term "ontology" in computer science, quoting his statement: "Data are fragments of a theory of the real world, and data processing juggles representations of these fragments of theory ... The issue is one of ontology, or the question of what exists."

== Selected publications ==
- Mealy, George H. (1955), "A method for synthesizing sequential circuits", Bell System Technical Journal, 34 (5): 1045–1079, doi:10.1002/j.1538-7305.1955.tb03788.x, MR 0073450.
- Mealy, George H. (1967), "Another Look at Data" (PDF), Proceedings of the November 14-16, 1967, Fall Joint Computer Conference (AFIPS Fall '67), New York, NY, USA: ACM, pp. 525–534, doi:10.1145/1465611.1465682, S2CID 18146748, archived from the original (PDF) on 2017-08-10.
