= Giuseppe De Giacomo =

Italian computer scientist (born 1965)

- Born: 8 August 1965 (age 60); Italy
- Awards: AAAI Fellow (2016); ACM Fellow (2015); EurAI Fellow (2012)
- Scientific career
- Fields: Artificial Intelligence; Knowledge Representation
- Institutions: Oxford University; Sapienza University
- Thesis: Decidability of ClassBased Knowledge Representation Formalisms (1995)
- Doctoral advisor: Maurizio Lenzerini
- Website: cs.ox.ac.uk; diag.uniroma1.it

Giuseppe De Giacomo (born 8 August 1965) is an Italian computer scientist. He is a Professor of Computer Science at the Department of Computer Science, University of Oxford (Oxford, UK), and Professor of Computer Engineering at the Department of Computer, Control and Management Engineering, Sapienza University of Rome (Rome, Italy). He is also a Senior Research Fellow at the Green Templeton College.

== Education ==
De Giacomo obtained his master's degree in Electronic Engineering in 1991 at Sapienza University of Rome. After that, in 1995, he earned his PhD from the same institution, under the supervision of Maurizio Lenzerini.

== Career and research ==
After the PhD, De Giacomo visited Yoav Shoham at Stanford University and then worked as a postdoctoral researcher at the University of Toronto in the Cognitive Robotics research group, working with Hector Levesque and Ray Reiter. De Giacomo returned to Sapienza University as a faculty member in 1998.

De Giacomo's research interests concern theoretical, methodological, and applicative aspects of different areas of Artificial Intelligence and Computer Science. He is internationally renowned for his significant contributions to the field of knowledge representation and reasoning, situation calculus, generalized forms of automated planning, temporal logics, verification and synthesis of KR-based systems, and business process modeling. De Giacomo has co-authored over 300 publications in top scientific journals and conference proceedings. His research was seminal to the area of description logics and ontologies for the introduction of a tractable fragment of description logics called DL-Lite.

De Giacomo served as associate program chair at the International Joint Conference on Artificial Intelligence (IJCAI) in 2021, as program chair for the European Conference on Artificial Intelligence (ECAI) in 2020, and as program chair for the International Conference on Principles of Knowledge Representation and Reasoning (KR) in 2014.

== Awards and honors ==
In 2019, De Giacomo was awarded an ERC Advanced Grant for the project titled White-Box Self-Programming Mechanisms (WhiteMech) (2019-2024).

In 2016, De Giacomo was elected an AAAI Fellow "for significant contributions to the field of knowledge representation and reasoning, and applications to data integration, ontologies, planning, and process synthesis and verification". He was also elected an ACM Fellow "for contributions to description logics, data management, and verification of data-driven processes" in 2015, and an EurAI Fellow in 2012.

He and his co-authors won the Classic Paper Award from the AAAI Conference on Artificial Intelligence in 2021, and the first 10-year Test-of-Time Award from the International Conference on Service Oriented Computing in 2013.

== Entrepreneurial activities ==
De Giacomo is the co-founder and scientific advisor of OBDA systems, an innovation startup of Sapienza University of Rome, and a company of the Almawave Group.
