= Maurizio Lenzerini =

Italian computer scientists

Maurizio Lenzerini (born 14 December 1954) is an Italian professor of computer science and engineering at the Sapienza University of Rome (Dipartimento di Ingegneria Informatica Automatica e Gestionale Antonio Ruberti), where he specializes in database theory, Ontology language, Knowledge Representation and Reasoning as well as service modeling. He is the author of over 400 peer-reviewed articles, a fellow of both the European Coordinating Committee for Artificial Intelligence and ACM, and a member of the Academia Europaea - The Academy of Europe.

His paper DL-Lite: Tractable Description Logics for Ontologies, written along with Diego Calvanese, Giuseppe De Giacomo, Domenico Lembo and Riccardo Rosati, won the AAAI 2021 Classic Paper Award as "the most influential paper from the Twentieth National Conference on Artificial Intelligence, held in 2005 in Pittsburgh, Pennsylvania, USA".

In 2022 he won the prestigious Peter Chen Award.
