= Pan Wen-Yuan =

Chinese-American electrical engineer (1912–1995)

- 潘文淵
- Born: July 15, 1912; Suzhou, Jiangsu, Republic of China
- Died: January 3, 1995 (aged 82); U.S.
- Education: Shanghai Jiao Tong University (BS); Stanford University (PhD)
- Known for: Establishing the IC industry in Taiwan
- Scientific career
- Fields: Electrical engineering
- Workplaces: Radio Research Laboratory; David Sarnoff Laboratories
- Thesis: A Complete Analysis of Audio Frequency Amplifier Using Pentode Tubes (1941)
- Doctoral advisor: Frederick Terman

Pan Wen-Yuan (Chinese: 潘文淵; July 15, 1912 – January 3, 1995) was a Taiwanese-American electrical engineer. Following a three-decade-long career as a researcher at RCA, he played a key role in establishing the integrated circuit (IC) industry in Taiwan in the 1970s and is known as the "father" of Taiwan's IC industry. After his death, the Industrial Technology Research Institute of Taiwan set up the Pan Wen Yuan Foundation and the Pan Wen Yuan Prize to reward people who have made significant contributions to Taiwan's semiconductor industry. Pan was a fellow of the Institute of Electrical and Electronics Engineers (IEEE) and the American Association for the Advancement of Science (AAAS).

== Early life and education ==
Pan was born on July 15, 1912, in Suzhou, Jiangsu, Republic of China. He graduated with a B.S. degree from the electrical engineering department of Shanghai Jiao Tong University in 1935, and enrolled at the graduate school of Stanford University in the United States in 1937 on a Chinese government scholarship. He earned his E.E. degree in 1939 and Ph.D. in 1940. His doctoral dissertation was "A Complete Analysis of the Resistance Coupled Amplifier Using Pentode Tubes", supervised by Frederick Terman.

== Career in the United States ==
As World War II/War of Resistance was beginning in China in 1937, Pan left for the United States and worked as a research scientist at the Radio Research Laboratory at Harvard University, which was established by Terman. From 1945 to 1974, he worked as a research scientist, and later director, at the David Sarnoff Laboratories of Radio Corporation of America (RCA) in Princeton, New Jersey. With his main research area in ultra high frequency technology, he published more than 100 papers and was awarded 30 US patents and 200 international patents. He was elected a Fellow of the Institute of Radio Engineers (a predecessor of the IEEE) in 1958, and a Fellow of the American Association for the Advancement of Science (AAAS) in 1961.

== Development of Taiwan's IC industry ==
In 1966, Pan and Fei Hua co-founded the Modern Engineering and Technology Seminar (METS), and Pan was the second METS convener. In the early 1970s, the Republic of China entered a period of crisis. In 1971, the ROC withdrew from the United Nations and severed diplomatic relations with Japan in 1972, and its economy was severely impacted by the global oil crisis of 1973. Premier Chiang Ching-kuo tasked Fei Hua, then Secretary-General of the Executive Yuan, with deciding on a major project in science and technology to implement. Fei convened with Pan and Fang Hsien-chi, the Secretary General of Telecommunications, and the three agreed that Taiwan should develop an electronics industry.

On February 7, 1974, Pan attended a breakfast meeting at the Xiaoxinxin (Chinese: 小欣欣; pinyin: Xiaǒxīnxīn) Soy Milk Shop in Taipei with six Taiwanese government officials, including Minister of Economic Affairs Sun Yun-suan and Minister of Transport Kao Yu-shu, as well as Fei Hua and Fang Hsien-chi. The seven attendees planned the development of Taiwan's electronics industry over breakfast, and Sun agreed to pay US$10 million to acquire RCA's semiconductor technology.

After the meeting, Pan established and chaired the Technical Advisory Committee in the United States, with mainly Chinese-American university researchers and senior executives from major corporations such as IBM and Bell Labs, to steer the development of Taiwan's integrated circuit (IC) industry. He also helped Minister Sun identify and recruit Chinese engineers in the US to establish the Electronics Research and Service Organization (ERSO) under Taiwan's Industrial Technology Research Institute (ITRI). Pan persuaded RCA, which had decided to exit the semiconductor industry, to sell its obsolete seven-micron CMOS technology to ITRI. Forty ERSO engineers were sent to RCA to receive training for a year, and RCA helped the ERSO build its first IC fabrication plant, which produced its first wafers in 1977–1978. By 1979, the ERSO plant had achieved better yields than RCA itself. Pan's group of recruits later constituted almost the entire senior leadership of Taiwan's semiconductor industry.

== Death and legacy ==
Pan died in the United States on January 3, 1995, aged 82. By then Taiwan had developed advanced 8-inch wafer processing technology and become a world leader in semiconductor manufacturing. To commemorate Pan's contributions, the ITRI and many industry leaders jointly established the Pan Wen Yuan Foundation. In 2004, the foundation set up the Pan Wen Yuan Prize to reward people who have made major contributions to Taiwan's semiconductor industry. Among the awardees are Morris Chang (2006), founder of TSMC, and Stan Shih (2010), founder of Acer Inc.

Pan is honored as the "father" of Taiwan's IC industry despite having never studied, settled, or worked for pay in Taiwan.
