= Francesco Calvanese =

Italian politician (1947–2025)

Member of the Chamber of Deputies of Italy for Campania 2
- In office 6 April 1994 – 8 May 1996

Personal details
- Born: 14 February 1947; Salerno, Italy
- Died: 16 April 2025 (aged 78); Salerno, Italy
- Political party: PCI (until 1991); PRC (1991–1995); MCU (1995–1998)
- Education: University of Salerno
- Occupation: Academic

Francesco Calvanese (14 February 1947 – 16 April 2025) was an Italian politician. A member of the Communist Refoundation Party and the Movement of Unitarian Communists, he served in the Chamber of Deputies from 1994 to 1996.

Calvanese died in Salerno on 16 April 2025, at the age of 78.
