= Antonio Luz Furtado =

Brazilian computer scientist and professor (born 1934)

- Born: 24 August 1934 (age 91)
- Education: University of Toronto (PhD)
- Known for: Databases, conceptual modeling, computing methodology, logic programming
- Awards: Norman Stuart Robertson Fellowship (1973), Commander of the Ordem Nacional do Mérito Científico (2006), Peter P. Chen Award (2014)

Antonio Luz Furtado (born 24 August 1934) is a Brazilian computer scientist and Professor of Computer Science known for his work in databases and conceptual modeling.

== Biography ==
Furtado received undergrad degrees in Economics from Universidade do Estado do Rio de Janeiro (1964) and Law from Universidade Federal do Rio de Janeiro (1957), a M.Sc. in Computer Science from Pontifícia Universidade Católica do Rio de Janeiro (PUC-Rio) (1969), a M.A. in Business Administration from Fundação Getúlio Vargas (1962), and his PhD from University of Toronto (1974). Currently he is Professor Emeritus and Senior Researcher at the Department of Informatics at PUC-Rio. Furtado's research focuses on computing methodology and techniques, mainly in databases and graphs, logic programming, and interactive storytelling.

Prof. Furtado attended the very first Entity-Relationship conference (ER 1979, Los Angeles, California) and had a fundamental role in establishing and developing the field of databases and conceptual modelling in Brazil for almost 4 decades. Furtado also participated in the creation of the first Computer Science department in Brazil (and one of the first in the world) at Pontifícia Universidade Católica do Rio de Janeiro in 1968.

Prof. Furtado has published pioneering books in data structures and organization of databases in the 1970s and 1980s, which were both important to establishing the field as a whole and to the education in Brazil. Furtado also performs research in Medieval Literature, having recently contributed the chapter "The Crusaders' Grail" to the book The Grail, the Quest and the World of Arthur, organized by Norris J. Lacy (Pennsylvania State University), Cambridge: D. S. Brewer (2008).

In his professional trajectory, he was a researcher with the Brazilian National Council for Scientific and Technological Development for more than 10 years; contributed to the advance of the Prolog language, was a senior researcher at IBM's research centre (Centro Científico Rio) from 1986 to 1988, and a professor at Instituto Militar de Engenharia from 1981 to 1984.

Furtado has received a number of awards achievements in information systems engineering. He was honored in 1973 with a Norman Stuart Robertson Fellowship by University of Toronto; nominated as member of the Board of Trustees VLBD Endowment in 1975; nominated in 2006 as Commander of the Ordem Nacional do Mérito Científico of the Presidência da República do Brasil; and in 2014 received the Peter P. Chen Award of Elsevier for Entity–relationship model research.

== Publications ==
Antonio Luz Furtado has published several books, papers and articles..

=== Selected books ===
- 2006. Mitos e Lendas: Heróis do Ocidente e do Oriente. 1. ed. Rio de Janeiro: Nova Era.
- 1987. Programação em Lógica. São Paulo: Blucher. With Marco A. Casanova and F. Giorno.
- 1986. Formal Techniques for Data Base Design. New York: Springer. With E. J. Neuhold.
- 1983. Estruturas de Dados. São Paulo: Campus. With Paulo A. Veloso, P. Azeredo, and Clésio Santos.
- 1979. Organização de Bancos de Dados. São Paulo: Campus. With Clésio Santos.
- 1973. Teoria dos Grafos - Algoritmos. Rio de Janeiro: Livros Técnicos e Científicos.

=== Articles ===
- 1969-2011: 193 publications, 47 journal publications, 85 peer-reviewed publications, and multiple book chapters, technical reports, manuscripts, pre-prints, submitted and accepted papers.
