= Diego Calvanese =

Italian computer scientist

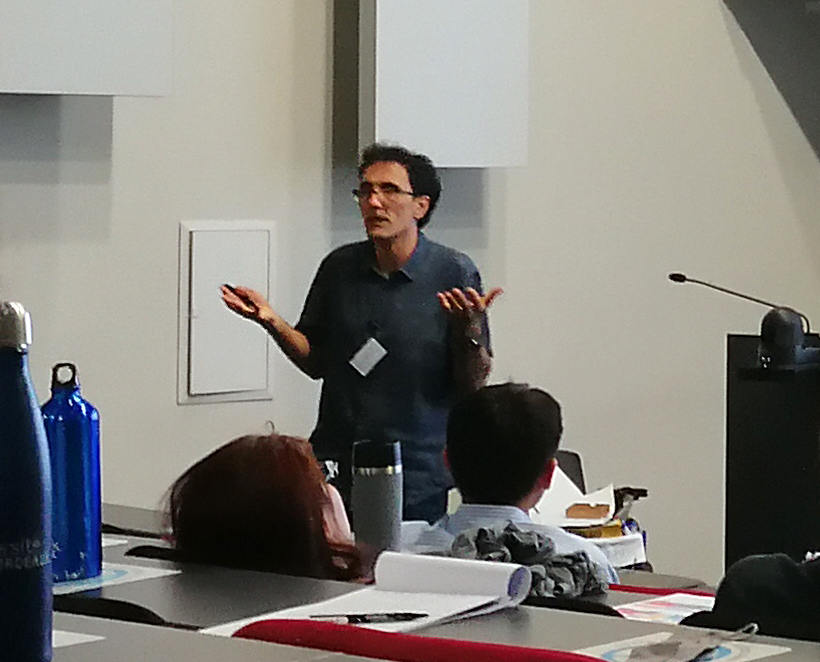
- Born: 1966 (age 59–60); Innsbruck, Austria
- Citizenship: Italian
- Education: Sapienza University of Rome
- Awards: ACM Fellow, European Association for Artificial Intelligence Fellow
- Scientific career
- Fields: Description Logics, knowledge representation and reasoning in AI, database theory
- Workplaces: Free University of Bozen-Bolzano, Umeå University
- Thesis: Unrestricted and Finite Model Reasoning in Class-Based Representation Formalisms (1995)
- Website: https://www.inf.unibz.it/~calvanese/

Diego Calvanese is an Italian computer scientist and professor at the faculty of computer science at the Free University of Bozen-Bolzano. In addition, since 2019, he is Wallenberg Visiting Professor at the department of computing science, Umeå University. He is well known for his scientific contributions in knowledge representation and reasoning in AI, description logics, and database theory.

== Education ==
Calvanese graduated in electronic engineering (110/110 cum laude) at Sapienza University, Rome, where he also completed his Ph.D. in Computer Science.

== Awards (selection) ==
- Fellow of the European Association for Artificial Intelligence (2015)
- Fellow of the Association for Computing Machinery (2019)

== Entrepreneurial Activities ==
Diego Calvanese is the initiator and co-founder of Ontopic, a spin-off of the Free University of Bozen-Bolzano.
