= Óscar Pastor (computer scientist) =

Spanish computer scientist

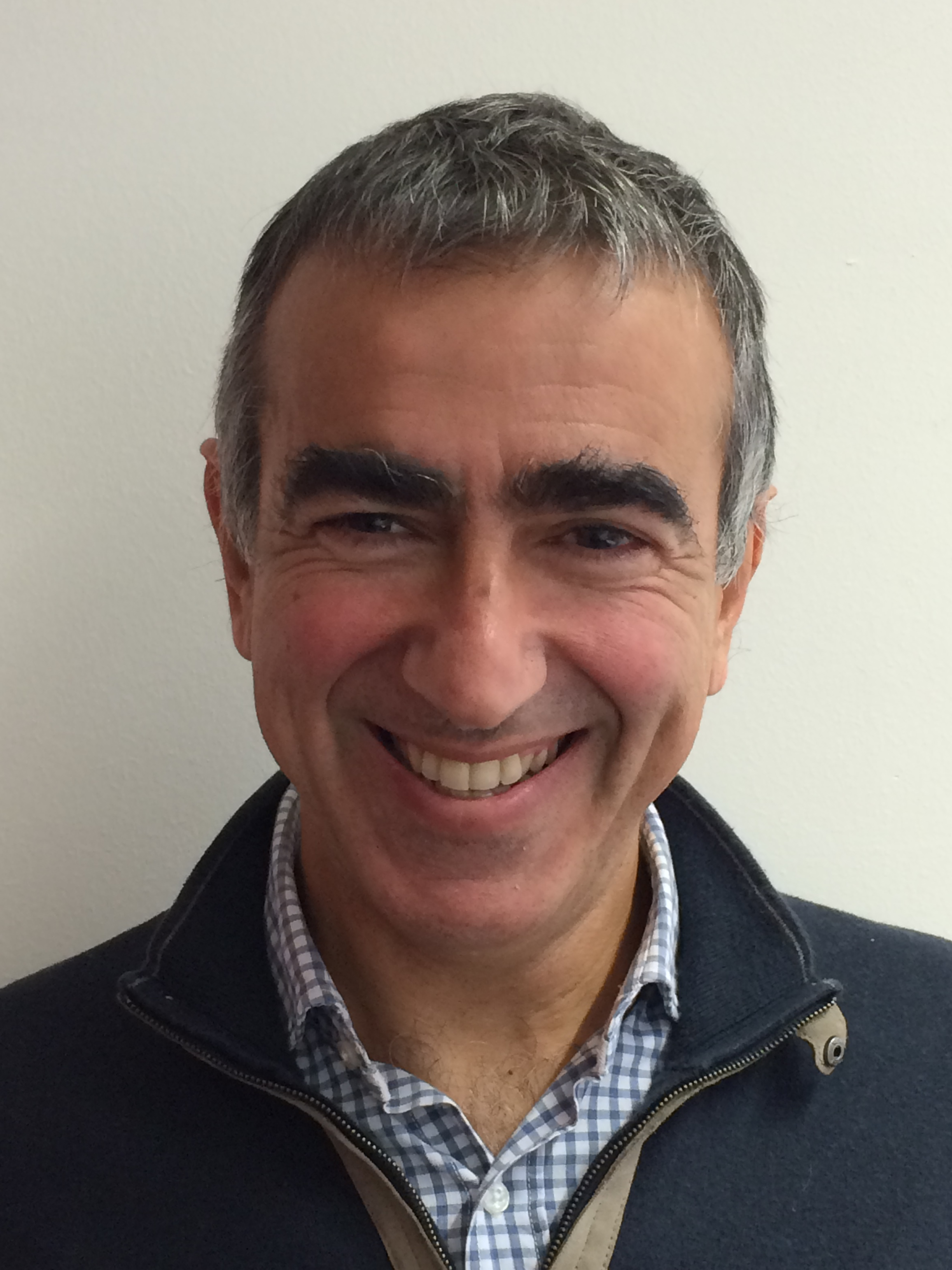
- Óscar Pastor
- Born: Óscar Pastor López; 3 March 1962 (age 64); Valencia, Spain
- Occupations: Computer scientist; Lecturer

Óscar Pastor (born 3 March 1962) is a Spanish computer scientist, Professor of software production methods at the Department of Information Systems and Computing of Universitat Politècnica de València, and the director of the Research Centre in Software Production Methods (PROS).

== Biography ==
Óscar ended high school in Instituto Benlliure (Valencia) in 1980. In 1985, he received a bachelor's degree on Physics from Universitat de València, where he specialised in Electronics and Computer Science. In 1992, he received a PhD from Universitat Politècnica de València with his thesis Diseño y Desarrollo de un Entorno de Producción Automática de Software basado en el Modelo Orientado a Objetos, supervised by Isidro Ramos.

Former researcher at HP Labs (Bristol, UK), in 1986 he became an associate professor at the Faculty of Computer Science of Universitat Politècnica de València. From 1996 to 2002 he was a tenured professor. From 2002 to date, he is full professor.

In 2022, he was elected a member of the Academia Europaea.

== Work ==
His main research interests include Software Engineering, Conceptual modeling, Model-driven development, genomic information systems (for Bioinformatics, Translational bioinformatics, Health informatics, etc.), and Empirical software engineering. He received the ER Fellow Award in 2010 for his contributions to the conceptual modeling area, and has been keynote speaker at a dozen of international conferences. He has also been strongly committed to technology transfer activities through the creation of spin-off companies such as Integranova and GEM Biosoft.

Within the area of model-driven software development, he advocates a full-model driven software lifecycle. He authored the OO-Method, an object-oriented, model-driven method for enterprise information systems, that is currently supported by the Integranova Software Solutions technology. The OO-Method covers the Platform-independent model layer (according to the Model-driven architecture paradigm). To tackle with modelling layers that are closer to the business stakeholders, he has explored several requirements engineering methods and languages (ranging from use cases to BPMN). Among them, he co-authored Communication Analysis, a business process modelling and requirements engineering method with a communicational orientation, as well as its integration with the OO-Method, in a way that Communication Analysis covers the Computation-independent model layer.

== Awards ==
- 2016: Peter P. Chen Award, Elsevier

== Publications ==
Óscar Pastor is author of over 200 scientific publications in conference proceedings, journals and books, among which the following stand out:

- 2007. Model-Driven Architecture in Practice: A Software Production Environment Based on Conceptual Modeling. With Juan Carlos Molina. Springer.
