= Data & Knowledge Engineering =

- Discipline: Computer science
- Language: English
- Edited by: P.P. Chen

Publication details
- History: 1985–present
- Publisher: Elsevier
- Frequency: Monthly
- Impact factor: 1.992 (2020)

Standard abbreviations
- ISO 4: Data Knowl. Eng.

Indexing
- CODEN: DKENEW
- ISSN: 0169-023X (print); 1872-6933 (web)
- LCCN: 90649274
- OCLC no.: 630595125

Links
- Journal homepage; Online archive

Data & Knowledge Engineering is a monthly peer-reviewed academic journal in the area of database systems and knowledge base systems. It is published by Elsevier and was established in 1985. The editor-in-chief is P.P. Chen (Louisiana State University).

== Abstracting and indexing ==
The journal is abstracted and indexed in Current Contents/Engineering, Computing & Technology, Ei Compendex, Inspec, Science Citation Index Expanded, Scopus, and Zentralblatt MATH. According to the Journal Citation Reports, the journal has a 2020 impact factor of 1.992.
