= Sudha Ram =

Indian-American business professor

Academic background
- Education: B.S., Chemistry, University of Madras; MBA, 1981, Indian Institute of Management Calcutta; PhD, 1985, Management Information Systems, University of Illinois at Urbana–Champaign
- Thesis: A model for the design of distributed databases (1985)

Academic work
- Institutions: Eller College of Management

Sudha Ram is an Indian American professor of business. As of 2026, She teaches at the University of Arizona's Eller College of Management and directs the INSITE: Center for Business Intelligence and Analytics.

== Early life and education ==
Ram completed her Bachelor of Science degree in chemistry from the University of Madras and received her MBA from the Indian Institute of Management Calcutta. Following this, she travelled to North America and enrolled in the University of Illinois for her PhD. Ram completed her PhD under the guidance of her doctoral advisor, computer scientist Geneva Belford.

== Career ==
Upon completing her PhD in 1985, Ram joined the faculty at the University of Arizona's Eller College of Management. She was a founding board member of the Maha Ganapati Temple of Arizona and taught Hindi at the Krishna Temple in Phoenix.

In 2011, Ram established the INSITE: Center for Business Intelligence and Analytics to "develop techniques, algorithms, and technologies to extract actionable insights from "Big Data" including structured and unstructured sources such as blogs, tweets, and other sources." As the director, she partnered with Fortaleza officials and the University of Fortaleza to solve their overcrowded transportation issues. Ram and her colleagues helped develop an online dashboard where Fortaleza city planners could access data about possible issues within the city's bus system. She also worked with researchers in the United States and led the creation of a model that was able to successfully predict approximately how many asthma-related incidents would plague a Dallas emergency room. Her research teams' model came to this conclusion based on an analysis of data gleaned from electronic medical records, air quality sensors and Twitter. Through the period of three months, Ram and her research team collected air quality data from environmental sensors and gathered and analyzed asthma-related tweets containing certain keywords. Once the data was collected, the model used text-mining techniques to figure out the ZIP codes where most of the hospital's patients live, according to electronic medical records.

As a result of her research endeavours, Ram was named the co-recipient of the Anheuser-Busch Chair in Entrepreneurship Studies alongside finance professor Sandy Klasa. In an effort to increase student retention at the university, Ram worked with Arizona's IT department to gather data on freshman ID cards (called CatCard) usage over a three-year period. By tracking their digital traces, she was able to correctly identify 85% of students who would drop out before they graduated. Ram then generated a list of the top 20% at high risk of dropping out and sent them out to the individual college advisers. However, this raised privacy concerns and was compared to China's Social Credit System. The following year, Ram was elected Editor in Chief of the Journal of Business Analytics ran through the Operational Research Society.

During the COVID-19 pandemic, Ram investigated ways to use information systems to help trace the spread of the virus for students, staff and faculty at the university. She led various projects including working on a Bluetooth-enabled app that would digitally trace contact that users have had with people around campus. Another one of her projects involved a web-based system using anonymized Wi-Fi logs to understand real-time movement and traffic patterns on campus.
