= Matthias Jarke =

German computer scientist (1952–2024)

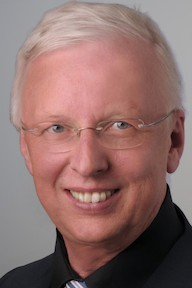
- Born: 28 May 1952; Hamburg, West Germany
- Died: 21 March 2024 (aged 71)
- Occupation: Computer scientist

Matthias Jarke (28 May 1952 – 21 March 2024) was a German computer scientist.

== Life and career ==
After double master's degrees in computer science and business administration at the University of Hamburg, Germany, he received his doctorate in operations research there in 1980. In 1981 he joined the Stern School of Management at New York University as an assistant professor, where he received an early promotion to associate professor in 1983, and early tenure in 1985. In 1986 he returned to Germany as a full professor of dialog-oriented systems at the University of Passau, from where he moved to RWTH Aachen University as Professor of Information Systems in 1991. From 1992-2000, he served as chairman of Aachen's Computer Science department.

From January 2000, he additionally became executive director of the Fraunhofer Institute for Applied Information Technology FIT in Sankt Augustin near Bonn, Germany. In 2010, he was also appointed chairman of the Fraunhofer ICT Group, and member of the Fraunhofer Presidential Board. With a budget of over €220 million and over 3,300 employees, Fraunhofer ICT Group is one of the largest applied research organizations in information and communication technology in Europe.

From 2002, Jarke was a founding director of the B-IT foundation which fosters the internationalization of German CS education through its Bonn-Aachen International Center for Information Technology (B-IT). In 2008, its international master programs in media informatics, life science informatics, and autonomous systems were augmented by a dedicated B-IT Research School of doctoral training, co-funded by the state of North Rhine-Westphalia.

Jarke died on 21 March 2024, at the age of 71.

== Work ==
In his research Jarke, investigated metadata management and data quality, requirements engineering, and information systems engineering with a focus on mobile and cooperative systems. He served as a member of the coordination team of the "RWTH-2020 Future Initiative" at RWTH Aachen University, an excellence program of the German federal government, and as deputy coordinator of the DFG-funded Excellence Cluster on Ultra High-speed Mobile Information and Communication UMIC.

Jarke authored or edited over twenty books and more than 300 refereed publications, was chief editor of the Elsevier journal "Information Systems" for ten years, and program chair of almost all leading international conferences in the database and information systems field. He was a fellow of the German Informatics society GI and was in 2012 elected to the acatech German National Academy of Engineering and Sciences. From 2000-2003 he served as treasurer of GI and was then elected as GI president for two consecutive terms 2004-2007. In this time, he also served as scientific coordinator of the "Year of Computer Science 2006" in which the German federal government chose computer science for the first and so far only topic of its annual Science Years.

== Sources ==
- http://www.umic.rwth-aachen.de/mainmenu/organisation/steering-committee/
- Fraunhofer Verbund Informations- und Kommunikationstechnik :: Contact
