= Apache CarbonData =

Column-oriented data storage format

- Initial release: 2013; 13 years ago
- Stable release: 2.3.0 / 12 March 2022; 4 years ago
- Operating system: Cross-platform
- Type: Database management system
- License: Apache License 2.0
- Website: carbondata.apache.org

Apache CarbonData is a free and open-source column-oriented data storage format of the Apache Hadoop ecosystem. It is similar to the other columnar-storage file formats available in Hadoop namely RCFile and ORC. It is compatible with most of the data processing frameworks in the Hadoop environment. It provides efficient data compression and encoding schemes with enhanced performance to handle complex data in bulk.

== History ==
CarbonData was developed at Huawei in 2013. The project was donated to the Apache Community in 2015 submitted to the Apache Incubator in June 2016. The project won top honors in the BlackDuck 2016 Open Source Rookies of the Year's Big Data category. Apache CarbonData has been a top-level Apache Software Foundation (ASF)-sponsored project since May 1, 2017.

== See also ==
- Pig (programming tool)
- Apache Hive
- Apache Impala
- Apache Drill
- Apache Kudu
- Apache Spark
- Apache Thrift
- Apache Parquet
- Trino (SQL query engine)
- Presto (SQL query engine)
