= Apache ORC =

Column-oriented data storage format

- Release: 20 February 2013; 13 years ago
- Stable release: 2.3.1 / 16 July 2026; 3 months ago
- Operating system: Cross-platform
- Type: Database management system
- License: Apache License 2.0
- Website: orc.apache.org
- Repository: ORC Repository

Apache ORC (Optimized Row Columnar) is a free and open-source column-oriented data storage format. It is similar to the other columnar-storage file formats available in the Hadoop ecosystem such as RCFile and Parquet. It is used by most of the data processing frameworks Apache Spark, Apache Hive, Apache Flink, and Apache Hadoop.

In February 2013, the Optimized Row Columnar (ORC) file format was announced by Hortonworks in collaboration with Facebook. A calendar month later, the Apache Parquet format was announced, developed by Cloudera and Twitter.

Apache ORC format is widely supported including Amazon Web Services' Glue,Google Cloud Platform's BigQuery, and Pandas (software).

== History ==
Version	Original release date	Latest version	Release date
1.0	2016-01-25	1.0.0	2016-01-25
1.1	2016-06-10	1.1.2	2016-07-08
1.2	2016-08-25	1.2.3	2016-12-12
1.3	2017-01-23	1.3.4	2017-10-16
1.4	2017-05-08	1.4.5	2019-12-09
1.5	2018-05-14	1.5.13	2021-09-15
1.6	2019-09-03	1.6.14	2022-04-14
1.7	2021-09-15	1.7.8	2023-01-21
1.8	2022-09-03	1.8.9	2025-05-06
1.9	2023-06-28	1.9.6	2025-05-06
2.0	2024-03-08	2.0.5	2025-05-06
2.1	2025-01-09	2.1.2	2025-05-06
Legend: Unsupported Supported Latest version Preview version

== See also ==
- Apache Arrow
- Apache Hive
- Apache NiFi
- Apache Parquet
- Apache Spark
- Pig (programming tool)
- Trino (SQL query engine)
- Presto (SQL query engine)
