= MapR =

American business software company

MapR Technologies, Inc.
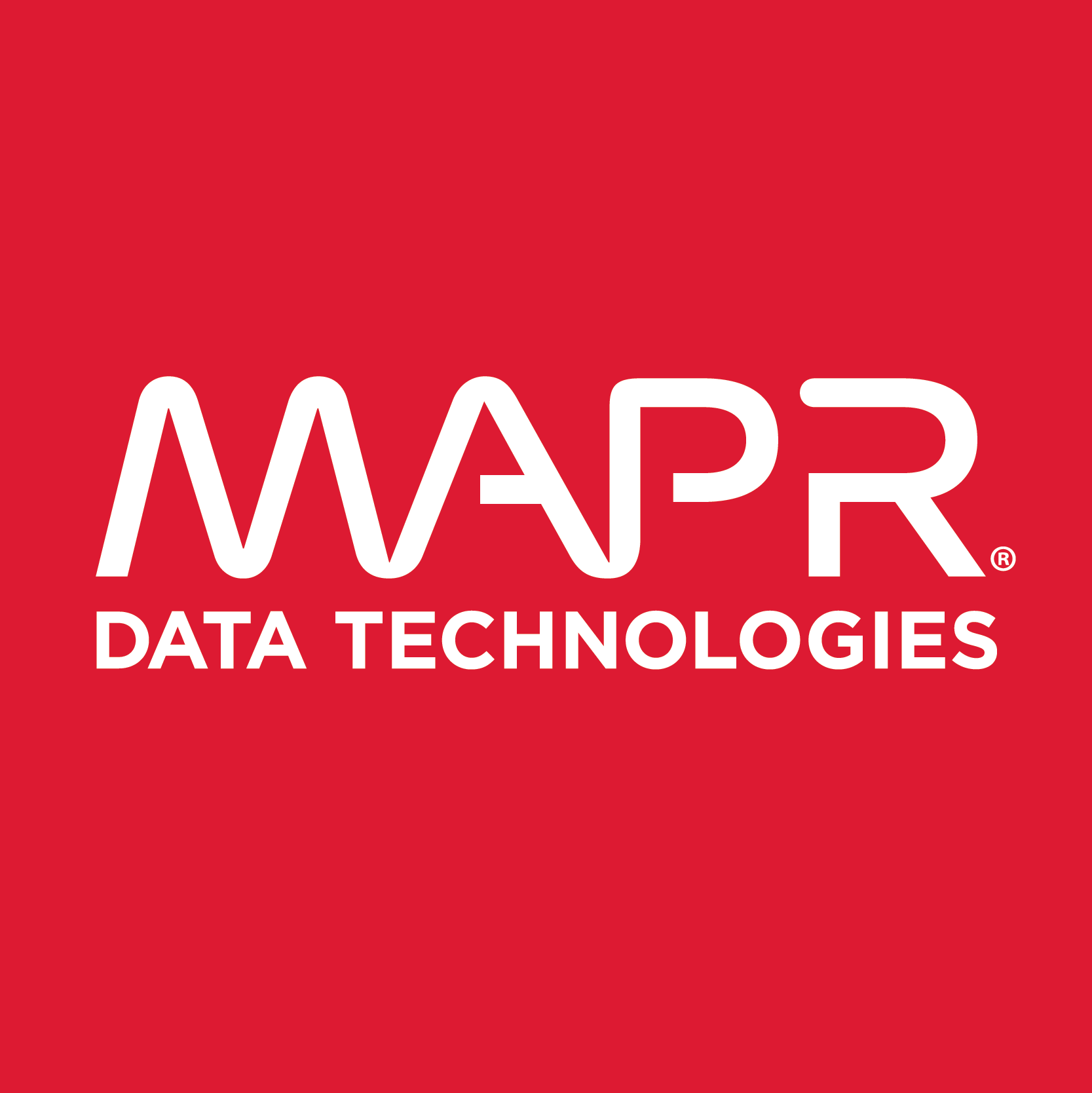
- MapR Company Logo
- Industry: Business software
- Founded: June 2009; 17 years ago
- Founder: M.C Srivas, John Schroeder
- Fate: Acquired by Hewlett Packard Enterprise in August 2019
- Headquarters: Santa Clara, California, United States of America
- Number of locations: 10
- Key people: John Schroeder (CEO and Chairman of the Board); MC Srivas (co-founder and former CTO)
- Products: Converged Data Platform, Apache Hadoop Distribution

MapR was a business software company headquartered in Santa Clara, California. MapR software provides access to a variety of data sources from a single computer cluster, including big data workloads such as Apache Hadoop and Apache Spark, a distributed file system, a multi-model database management system, and event stream processing, combining analytics in real-time with operational applications. Its technology runs on both commodity hardware and public cloud computing services. In August 2019, following financial difficulties, the technology and intellectual property of the company were sold to Hewlett Packard Enterprise.

== Funding ==
MapR was privately held with original funding of $9 million from Lightspeed Venture Partners and New Enterprise Associates in 2009. MapR executives come from Google, Lightspeed Venture Partners, Informatica, EMC Corporation and Veoh. MapR had an additional round of funding led by Redpoint Ventures in August, 2011. A round in 2013 was led by Mayfield Fund that also included Greenspring Associates. In June 2014, MapR closed a $110 million financing round that was led by Google Capital. Qualcomm Ventures also participated, along with existing investors Lightspeed Venture Partners, Mayfield Fund, New Enterprise Associates and Redpoint Ventures.

In May 2019, the company announced that it would shut down if it was unable to find additional funding.

== History ==
The company contributed to the Apache Hadoop projects HBase, Pig, Apache Hive, and Apache ZooKeeper.

MapR entered a technology licensing agreement with EMC Corporation on 2011, supporting an EMC-specific distribution of Apache Hadoop. MapR was selected by Amazon Web Services to provide an upgraded version of Amazon's Elastic MapReduce (EMR) service. MapR broke the minute sort speed record on Google's Compute platform.

== See also ==
- Apache Accumulo
- Apache Software Foundation
- Bigtable
- Database-centric architecture
- MapReduce
- RainStor
