= Sawzall =

Sawzall may refer to:

- Sawzall (tool), a brand of reciprocating saw manufactured by Milwaukee Electric Tool
- Sawzall (programming language), a domain-specific programming language
- "Sawzall" (song), by the American singer and songwriter Banks
