= Hortonworks =

American software company

Hortonworks, Inc.
- Type: Subsidiary
- Industry: Computer software
- Founded: 2011; 15 years ago
- Headquarters: Santa Clara, California, United States
- Products: Hortonworks Data Platform, Hortonworks DataFlow, Hortonworks DataPlane
- Number of employees: ~1,110 (2017)
- Parent: Cloudera
- Website: Hortonworks.com

Hortonworks, Inc. was a data software company based in Santa Clara, California that developed and supported open-source software (primarily around Apache Hadoop) designed to manage big data and associated processing.

Hortonworks software was used to build enterprise data services and applications such as IoT (connected cars, for example), single view of X (such as customer, risk, patient), and advanced analytics and machine learning (such as next best action and realtime cybersecurity). Hortonworks had three interoperable product lines:

- Hortonworks Data Platform (HDP): based on Apache Hadoop, Apache Hive, Apache Spark
- Hortonworks DataFlow (HDF): based on Apache NiFi, Apache Storm, Apache Kafka
- Hortonworks DataPlane services (DPS): based on Apache Atlas and Cloudbreak and a pluggable architecture into which partners such as IBM can add their services.

In January 2019, Hortonworks completed its merger with Cloudera.

== History ==
Hortonworks was formed in June 2011 as an independent company, funded by $23 million venture capital from Yahoo! and Benchmark Capital. Its first office was in Sunnyvale, California. The company employed contributors to the open source software project Apache Hadoop. The Hortonworks Data Platform (HDP) product, first released in June 2012, included Apache Hadoop and was used for storing, processing, and analyzing large volumes of data. The platform was designed to deal with data from many sources and formats. The platform included Hadoop technology such as the Hadoop Distributed File System, MapReduce, Pig, Hive, HBase, ZooKeeper, and additional components.

Eric Baldeschweiler (from Yahoo) was initial chief executive, and Rob Bearden chief operating officer, formerly from SpringSource. Benchmark partner Peter Fenton was a board member. The company name refers to the character Horton the Elephant, since the elephant is the symbol for Hadoop.

In October 2018, Hortonworks and Cloudera announced they would be merging in an all-stock merger of equals. After the merger, the Apache products of Hortonworks became Cloudera Data Platform.
