= Sqoop =

Data management application

Apache Sqoop
- Developer: Apache Software Foundation
- Initial release: 1 June 2009; 16 years ago
- Final release: 1.4.7 / December 6, 2017; 8 years ago
- Repository: Sqoop Repository
- Written in: Java
- Operating system: Cross-platform
- Type: Data management
- License: Apache License 2.0
- Website: sqoop.apache.org

Sqoop is a command-line interface application for transferring data between relational databases and Hadoop.

The Apache Sqoop project was retired in June 2021 and moved to the Apache Attic.

== Description ==
Sqoop supports incremental loads of a single table or a free form SQL query as well as saved jobs which can be run multiple times to import updates made to a database since the last import. Imports can also be used to populate tables in Hive or HBase. Exports can be used to put data from Hadoop into a relational database. Sqoop got the name from "SQL-to-Hadoop". Sqoop became a top-level Apache project in March 2012.

Informatica provides a Sqoop-based connector from version 10.1. Pentaho provides open-source Sqoop based connector steps, Sqoop Import and Sqoop Export, in their ETL suite Pentaho Data Integration since version 4.5 of the software. Microsoft uses a Sqoop-based connector to help transfer data from Microsoft SQL Server databases to Hadoop. Couchbase, Inc. also provides a Couchbase Server-Hadoop connector by means of Sqoop.

== See also ==
- Apache Hadoop
- Apache Hive
- Apache Accumulo
- Apache HBase

== Bibliography ==
- White, Tom (2010). "Chapter 15: Sqoop". Hadoop: The Definitive Guide (2nd ed.). O'Reilly Media. pp. 477–495. ISBN 978-1-449-38973-4.
