= Parallelization contract =

The parallelization contract or PACT programming model is a generalization of the MapReduce programming model and uses second order functions to perform concurrent computations on large (petabytes) data sets in parallel.

== Overview ==
Similar to MapReduce, arbitrary user code is handed and executed by PACTs. However, PACT generalizes a couple of MapReduce's concepts:

- Second-order functions: PACT provides more second-order functions. Currently, five second-order functions called Input Contracts are supported. This set might be extended in the future.
- Program structure: PACT allows the composition of arbitrary acyclic data flow graphs. In contract, MapReduce programs have a static structure (Map -> Reduce).
- Data Model: PACT's data model are records of arbitrary many fields of arbitrary types. MapReduce's KeyValue-Pairs can be considered as records with two fields.

Apache Flink, an open-source parallel data processing platform has implemented PACTs. Flink allows users to specify user functions with annotations.

== Logical view ==
Parallelization Contracts (PACTs) are data processing operators in a data flow. Therefore, a PACT has one or more data inputs and one or more outputs. A PACT consists of two components:

- Input Contract
- User function
- User code annotations

The figure below shows how those components work together. Input Contracts split the input data into independently processable subset. The user code is called for each of these independent subsets. All calls can be executed in parallel, because the subsets are independent.

Optionally, the user code can be annotated with additional information. These annotations disclose some information on the behavior of the black-box user function. The PACT Compiler can utilize the information to obtain more efficient execution plans. However, while a missing annotation will not change the result of the execution, an incorrect Output Contract produces wrong results.

The currently supported Input Contracts and annotation are presented and discussed in the following.

=== Input Contracts ===
Input Contracts split the input data of a PACT into independently processable subsets that are handed to the user function of the PACT. Input Contracts vary in the number of data inputs and the way how independent subsets are generated.

More formally, Input Contracts are second-order functions with a first-order function (the user code), one or more input sets, and none or more key fields per input as parameters. The first-order function is called (one or) multiple times with subsets of the input set(s). Since the first-order functions have no side effects, each call is independent from each other and all calls can be done in parallel.

The second-order functions map() and reduce() of the MapReduce programming model are Input Contracts in the context of the PACT programming model.

== MAP ==
The Map Input Contract works in the same way as in MapReduce. It has a single input and assigns each input record to its own subset. Hence, all records are processed independently from each other.

== REDUCE ==
The Reduce Input Contract has the same semantics as the reduce function in MapReduce. It has a single input and groups together all records that have identical key fields. Each of these groups is handed as a whole to the user code and processed by it (see figure below). The PACT Programming Model does also support optional Combiners, e.g. for partial aggregations.

== CROSS ==
The Cross Input Contract works on two inputs. It builds the Cartesian product of the records of both inputs. Each element of the Cartesian product (pair of records) is handed to the user code.

== MATCH ==
The Match Input Contract works on two inputs. From both inputs it matches those records that are identical on their key fields come from different inputs. Hence, it resembles an equality join where the keys of both inputs are the attributes to join on. Each matched pair of records is handed to the user code.

== COGROUP ==
The CoGroup Input Contract works on two inputs as well. It can be seen as a Reduce on two inputs. On each input, the records are grouped by key (such as Reduce does) and handed to the user code. In contrast to Match, the user code is also called for a key if only one input has a pair with it.

=== Pact Record Data Model ===
In contrast to MapReduce, PACT uses a more generic data model of records (Pact Record) to pass data between functions. The Pact Record can be thought of as a tuple with a free schema. The interpretation of the fields of a record is up to the user function. A Key/Value pair (as in MapReduce) is a special case of that record with only two fields (the key and the value).

For input contracts that operate on keys (like //Reduce//, //Match//, or //CoGroup//, one specifies which combination of the record's fields make up the key. An arbitrary combination of fields may used. See the Query Example on how programs defining //Reduce// and //Match// contracts on one or more fields and can be written to minimally move data between fields.

The record may be sparsely filled, i.e. it may have fields that have //null// values. It is legal to produce a record where for example only fields 2 and 5 are set. Fields 1, 3, 4 are interpreted to be //null//. Fields that are used by a contract as key fields may however not be null, or an exception is raised.

=== User code annotations ===
User code annotation are optional in the PACT programming model. They allow the developer to make certain behaviors of her/his user code explicit to the optimizer. The PACT optimizer can utilize that information to obtain more efficient execution plans. However, it will not impact the correctness of the result if a valid annotation was not attached to the user code. On the other hand, invalidly specified annotations might cause the computation of wrong results. In the following, we list the current set of available Output Contracts.

== Constant Fields ==
The Constant Fields annotation marks fields that are not modified by the user code function. Note that for every input record a constant field may not change its content and position in any output record! In case of binary second-order functions such as Cross, Match, and CoGroup, the user can specify one annotation per input.

== Constant Fields Except ==
The Constant Fields Except annotation is inverse to the Constant Fields annotation. It annotates all fields which might be modified by the annotated user-function, hence the optimizer considers any not annotated field as constant. This annotation should be used very carefully! Again, for binary second-order functions (Cross, Match, CoGroup), one annotation per input can be defined. Note that either the Constant Fields or the Constant Fields Except annotation may be used for an input.

=== PACT programs ===
PACT programs are constructed as data flow graphs that consist of data sources, PACTs, and data sinks. One or more data sources read files that contain the input data and generate records from those files. Those records are processed by one or more PACTs, each consisting of an Input Contract, user code, and optional code annotations. Finally, the results are written back to output files by one or more data sinks. In contrast to the MapReduce programming model, a PACT program can be arbitrary complex and has no fixed structure.

The figure below shows a PACT program with two data sources, four PACTs, and one data sink. Each data source reads data from a specified location in the file system. Both sources forward the data to respective PACTs with Map Input Contracts. The user code is not shown in the figure. The output of both Map PACTs streams into a PACT with a Match Input Contract. The last PACT has a Reduce Input Contract and forwards its result to the data sink.

=== Advantages of PACT over MapReduce ===
- The PACT programming model encourages a more modular programming style. Although the number of user functions is usually higher, they are more fine-grain and focus on specific problems. Hence, interweaving of functionality which is common for MapReduce jobs can be avoided.
- Data analysis tasks can be expressed as straightforward data flows, especially when multiple inputs are required.
- PACT has a record-based data model, which reduces the need to specify custom data types as not all data items need to be packed into a single value type.
- PACT frequently eradicates the need for auxiliary structures, such as the distributed cache, which "break" the parallel programming model.
- Data organization operations such as building a Cartesian product or combining records with equal keys are done by the runtime system. In MapReduce such often needed functionality must be provided by the developer of the user code.
- PACTs specify data parallelization in a declarative way which leaves several degrees of freedom to the system. These degrees of freedom are an important prerequisite for automatic optimization. The PACT compiler enumerate different execution strategies and chooses the strategy with the least estimated amount of data to ship. In contrast, Hadoop executes MapReduce jobs always with the same strategy.
