= David DeWitt =

American computer scientist

David J. DeWitt
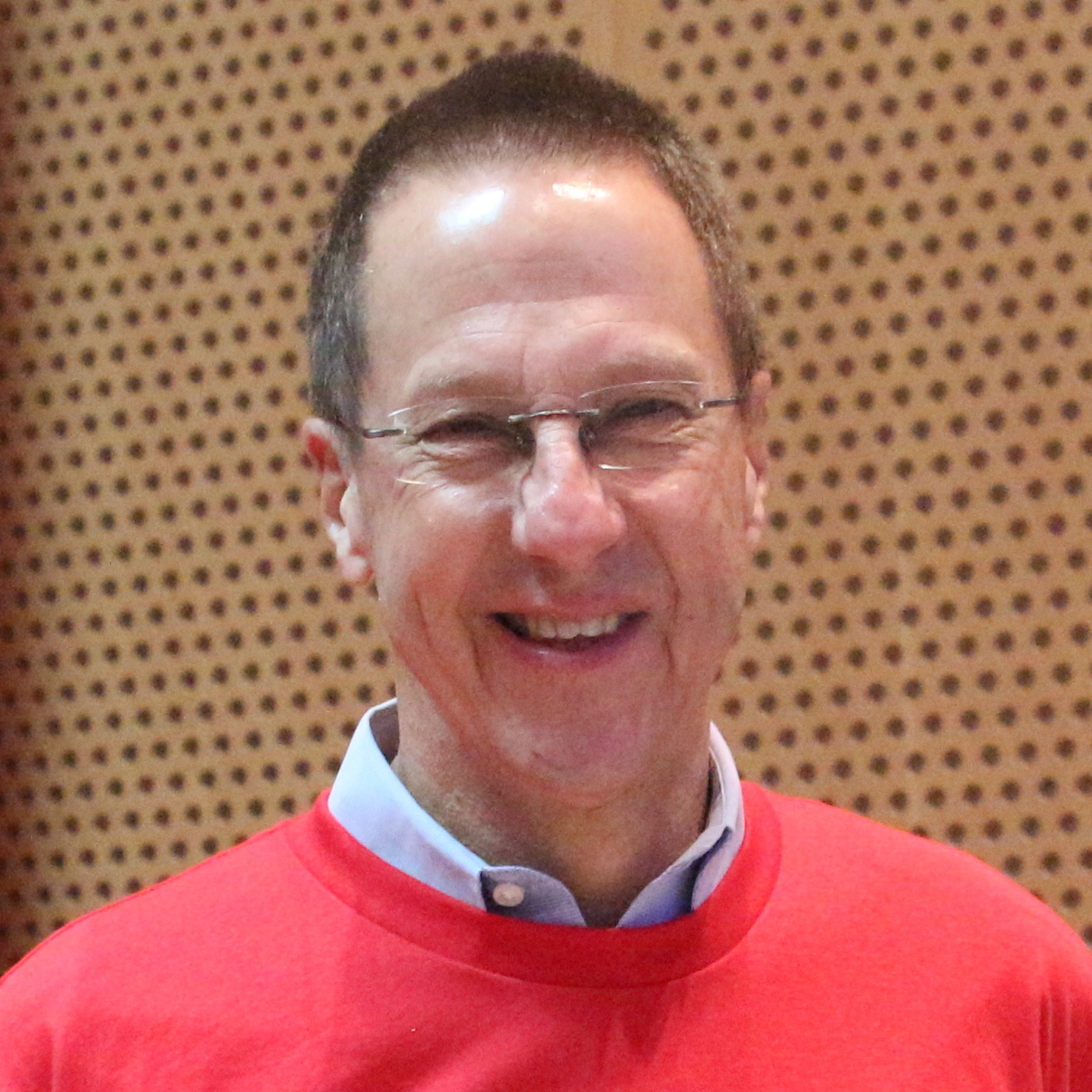
- Born: c. 1948 (age 77–78); United States
- Education: Colgate University; University of Michigan
- Occupation: Technical Fellow at Microsoft
- Awards: IEEE Emanuel R. Piore Award (2009)
- Scientific career
- Fields: Computer science
- Workplaces: University of Wisconsin–Madison, Microsoft, Massachusetts Institute of Technology
- Website: pages.cs.wisc.edu/~dewitt/

David J. DeWitt (born July 20, 1948) is a computer scientist specializing in database management system research at the Massachusetts Institute of Technology. Prior to moving to MIT, DeWitt was the John P. Morgridge Professor (Emeritus) of Computer Sciences at the University of Wisconsin–Madison. He was also a Technical Fellow at Microsoft, leading the Microsoft Jim Gray Systems Lab at Madison, Wisconsin.

Professor DeWitt received a B.A. degree from Colgate University in 1970, and a Ph.D. from the University of Michigan in 1976. His Ph.D. dissertation was in computer architecture, and studied how to translate assembly into optimized microcode. After completing his Ph.D., he then joined the University of Wisconsin-Madison where he founded the Wisconsin Database Group.

Professor DeWitt is known for his research in the areas of parallel databases, benchmarking, object-oriented databases, and XML databases.

He was elected a member of the National Academy of Engineering (1998) for the theory and construction of database systems. He is also a Fellow of the Association for Computing Machinery. He received the ACM SIGMOD Innovations Award (now renamed SIGMOD Edgar F. Codd Innovations Award) in 1995 for his contributions to the database systems field. In 2008, ACM recognized the seminal contributions of his Gamma parallel database system project with the ACM Software System Award. In 2009, he received the IEEE Emanuel R. Piore Award for his contributions to the database systems field.

== Research contributions ==
=== Computer architecture and database machines ===
After joining Wisconsin, David J. DeWitt shifted his research from computer architecture to database systems. His early work focused on database machines, including DIRECT, a multiprocessor relational database system that supported both inter-query and intra-query parallelism. With Haran Boral, he also explored the use of data flow for database query processing. Their work examined when added parallelism improved performance and when the cost of communication between processors offset those gains.

In 1983, Boral and DeWitt published a paper titled "Database Machines: An Idea Whose Time Has Passed? A Critique of the Future of Database Machines." The paper argued that the technology trends were moving against database machines: Commodity processors and storage were improving rapidly, while specialized database hardware was not keeping pace. Boral and DeWitt argued that riding this commodity hardware trend was a better path to building high-performance, scalable database systems. This critique marked a turning point in DeWitt’s work toward shared-nothing parallel database systems. DeWitt and Jim Gray later described this shift as one from parallel database machines built around exotic hardware to conventional shared-nothing hardware coupled with highly parallel dataflow software.

=== Database benchmarking and the DeWitt clause ===
Dina Bitton, DeWitt, and Carolyn Turbyfill developed a comprehensive benchmarking framework for database systems, that defined a synthetic database, a data generator, and a set of queries so that different relational database systems could be tested on the same workload. The work became known as the Wisconsin Benchmark. A decade later, David DeWitt, Michael Carey, and Jeffrey Naughton developed the OO7 Benchmark for object-oriented database systems. OO7 reported a collection of measurements covering different parts of system performance rather than reducing a system to a single score.

A benchmark study done by David DeWitt in 1982, then an assistant professor, using the Wisconsin Benchmark, showed that many systems suffered from performance issues. The particularly poor performance of the Oracle database system displeased Larry Ellison. Several commercial database vendors included an end-user license agreement provision, colloquially known as the DeWitt Clause, that prohibits researchers and scientists from explicitly using the names of their systems in academic papers. In essence, this forbids the publication of benchmarks that the database vendor has not sanctioned. Such clauses remained in the licenses of nearly all database systems. It took nearly four decades for major cloud database vendors to start removing the DeWitt clause from their licenses, although licenses for on-premises database systems still contain this language as of 2026.

=== The Gamma parallel database system ===
In 1984, DeWitt started the Gamma project to explore whether a database system built from commodity processors and disks could scale by adding more compute nodes. Gamma horizontally partitioned relations across the processors and disks, often by hashing on an attribute used by the query. Tuples were routed to the processor that owned the corresponding partition, allowing much of a query to run locally and in parallel. As nodes were added, both processing capacity and I/O bandwidth could grow with the system, while execution required relatively little runtime coordination. The first prototype of Gamma was operational by the fall of 1985 and used 20 VAX 11/750 processors. In the period of 1986-1988, the Gamma prototype was enhanced with new operators (aggregate and update operators), new parallel join methods, and a complete concurrency control mechanism. In the spring of 1989, Gamma was ported to a 32 processor Intel iPSC/2 hypercube and the VAX-based prototype was retired.

The Gamma project developed innovative data partitioning and parallel query execution strategies. Key innovations include extending hash-based join algorithms to multiple processors, the use of sampling to detect and mitigate skew, and chained declustering to spread the load across the remaining nodes after a single node failure instead of shifting it to a single backup. ACM recognized Gamma with the 2008 Software System Award for being "the first embodiment of a parallel, shared-nothing database system running on a cluster of commodity computers".

=== Extensible, object, and spatial database systems ===
Alongside Gamma, DeWitt and his collaborators developed EXODUS, an extensible framework for building database systems for new data models and applications. Rather than hard-wire every component around one model, EXODUS provided reusable storage and query-processing components that could be specialized for a new system. Goetz Graefe and David DeWitt applied the same idea to query optimization with their EXODUS Optimizer Generator, building an extensible optimizer from algebraic transformation rules, implementation methods, and cost functions supplied for the target system. SHORE later brought object-database and file-system ideas together in a persistent object repository, with the goal of supporting both database-style objects and ordinary file-system access in one storage system. Paradise further extended Gamma's parallel processing ideas to geo-spatial data, where spatial objects (for example, a large satellite image) can cross partition boundaries. Paradise used spatial declustering to keep related data together and, for large raster objects, would pull only the needed pieces across nodes rather than moving the whole object.

=== Continuous queries and later work ===
The NiagaraCQ project designed a database for potentially millions of standing queries over changing Internet data. A key innovation was grouping queries with similar structure so that they could share the common work, instead of being evaluated separately. The NiagaraCQ paper received the 2010 SIGMOD Test of Time Award, for "open[ing] the new field of high-performance systems for continuous query processing, and [being] a strong force in shaping the following generations of stream processing systems".

After retiring from the University of Wisconsin-Madison in 2008, DeWitt joined Microsoft as a Technical Fellow and established the Jim Gray Systems Lab in Madison, WI, in partnership with UW-Madison. One of the projects at the Jim Gray Systems Lab was PolyBase, which let the SQL Server Parallel Data Warehouse query data stored in Hadoop and would optimize queries to determine whether an operation should run in the relational engine or be translated into MapReduce based on the cost of processing and moving the data.

== Personal life ==
Professor DeWitt is an avid swimmer.
