= Apache Kudu =

Open-source column-oriented data store

- Other names: Kudu
- Developer: Apache Kudu Committers and PMC Members
- Stable release: 1.18.0 / 14 July 2025; 5 months ago
- Repository: Kudu Repository
- Written in: C++
- Operating system: Linux, macOS
- Type: Database management system, Distributed data store
- License: Apache License 2.0
- Website: kudu.apache.org

Apache Kudu is a free and open source column-oriented data store of the Apache Hadoop ecosystem. It is compatible with most of the data processing frameworks in the Hadoop environment. It provides completeness to Hadoop's storage layer to enable fast analytics on fast data.

The open source project to build Apache Kudu began as internal project at Cloudera. The first version Apache Kudu 1.0 was released 19 September 2016.

== Comparison with other storage engines ==
Kudu was designed and optimized for OLAP workloads. Like HBase, it is a real-time store that supports key-indexed record lookup and mutation. Kudu differs from HBase since Kudu's datamodel is a more traditional relational model, while HBase is schemaless. Kudu's "on-disk representation is truly columnar and follows an entirely different storage design than HBase/Bigtable".

== See also ==
- List of column-oriented DBMSes
