= Parallel database =

Database system utilizing parallelization

A parallel database system seeks to improve performance through parallelization of various operations, such as loading data, building indexes and evaluating queries. Although data may be stored in a distributed fashion, the distribution is governed solely by performance considerations. Parallel databases improve processing and input/output speeds by using multiple CPUs and disks in parallel. Centralized and client–server database systems are not powerful enough to handle such applications. In parallel processing, many operations are performed simultaneously, as opposed to serial processing, in which the computational steps are performed sequentially. Parallel databases can be roughly divided into two groups, the first group of architecture is the multiprocessor architecture, the alternatives of which are the following:

Shared-memory architecture
Where multiple processors share the main memory (RAM) space but each processor has its own disk (HDD). If many processes run simultaneously, the speed is reduced, the same as a computer when many parallel tasks run and the computer slows down.
Shared-disk architecture
Where Each node has its own main memory, but all nodes share mass storage, usually a storage area network. In practice, each node usually also has multiple processors.
Shared-nothing architecture
Where each node has its own mass storage as well as main memory.

The other architecture group is called hybrid architecture, which includes:

- Non-Uniform Memory Architecture (NUMA), which involves the non-uniform memory access.
- Cluster (shared nothing + shared disk: SAN/NAS), which is formed by a group of connected computers.

In this switches or hubs are used to connect different computers usually simple topologies are used to connect different computers. It is much smarter if switches are implemented.

== Types of parallelism ==
Intraquery parallelism
A single query that is executed in parallel using multiple processors or disks.
Independent parallelism
Execution of each operation individually in different processors only if they can be executed independent of each other. For example, if we need to join four tables, then two can be joined at one processor and the other two can be joined at another processor. Final join can be done later.
Pipe-lined parallelism
Execution of different operations in pipe-lined fashion. For example, if we need to join three tables, one processor may join two tables and send the result set records as and when they are produced to the other processor. In the other processor the third table can be joined with the incoming records and the final result can be produced.
Intraoperation parallelism
Execution of single complex or large operations in parallel in multiple processors. For example, ORDER BY clause of a query that tries to execute on millions of records can be parallelized on multiple processors.
