= MapReduce =

Parallel programming model

MapReduce is a programming model and an associated implementation for processing and generating big data sets with a parallel and distributed algorithm on a cluster.

A MapReduce program is composed of a map procedure, which performs filtering and sorting (such as sorting students by first name into queues, one queue for each name), and a reduce method, which performs a summary operation (such as counting the number of students in each queue, yielding name frequencies). The "MapReduce System" (also called "infrastructure" or "framework") orchestrates the processing by marshalling the distributed servers, running the various tasks in parallel, managing all communications and data transfers between the various parts of the system, and providing for redundancy and fault tolerance.

The model is a specialization of the split-apply-combine strategy for data analysis. It is inspired by the map and reduce functions commonly used in functional programming, although their purpose in the MapReduce framework is not the same as in their original forms. The key contributions of the MapReduce framework are not the actual map and reduce functions (which, for example, resemble the 1995 Message Passing Interface standard's reduce and scatter operations), but the scalability and fault-tolerance achieved for a variety of applications due to parallelization. As such, a single-threaded implementation of MapReduce is usually not faster than a traditional (non-MapReduce) implementation; any gains are usually only seen with multi-threaded implementations on multi-processor hardware. The use of this model is beneficial only when the optimized distributed shuffle operation (which reduces network communication cost) and fault tolerance features of the MapReduce framework come into play. Optimizing the communication cost is essential to a good MapReduce algorithm.

MapReduce libraries have been written in many programming languages, with different levels of optimization. A popular open-source implementation that has support for distributed shuffles is part of Apache Hadoop. The name MapReduce originally referred to the proprietary Google technology, but has since become a generic trademark. By 2014, Google was no longer using MapReduce as its primary big data processing model, and development on Apache Mahout had moved on to more capable and less disk-oriented mechanisms that incorporated full map and reduce capabilities.

== Overview ==
MapReduce is a framework for processing parallelizable problems across large datasets using a large number of computers (nodes), collectively referred to as a cluster (if all nodes are on the same local network and use similar hardware) or a grid (if the nodes are shared across geographically and administratively distributed systems, and use more heterogeneous hardware). Processing can occur on data stored either in a filesystem (unstructured) or in a database (structured). MapReduce can take advantage of the locality of data, processing it near the place it is stored in order to minimize communication overhead.

A MapReduce framework (or system) is usually composed of three operations (or steps):

1. Map: each worker node applies the map function to the local data, and writes the output to a temporary storage. A master node ensures that only one copy of the redundant input data is processed.
2. Shuffle: worker nodes redistribute data based on the output keys (produced by the map function), such that all data belonging to one key is located on the same worker node.
3. Reduce: worker nodes now process each group of output data, per key, in parallel.

MapReduce allows for the distributed processing of the map and reduction operations. Maps can be performed in parallel, provided that each mapping operation is independent of the others; in practice, this is limited by the number of independent data sources and/or the number of CPUs near each source. Similarly, a set of 'reducers' can perform the reduction phase, provided that all outputs of the map operation that share the same key are presented to the same reducer at the same time, or that the reduction function is associative. While this process often appears inefficient compared to algorithms that are more sequential (because multiple instances of the reduction process must be run), MapReduce can be applied to significantly larger datasets than a single "commodity" server can handle – a large server farm can use MapReduce to sort a petabyte of data in only a few hours. The parallelism also offers some possibility of recovering from partial failure of servers or storage during the operation: if one mapper or reducer fails, the work can be rescheduled – assuming the input data are still available.

Another way to look at MapReduce is as a 5-step parallel and distributed computation:

1. Prepare the Map() input – the "MapReduce system" designates Map processors, assigns the input key K1 that each processor would work on, and provides that processor with all the input data associated with that key.
2. Run the user-provided Map() code – Map() is run exactly once for each K1 key, generating output organized by key K2.
3. "Shuffle" the Map output to the Reduce processors – the MapReduce system designates Reduce processors, assigns the K2 key each processor should work on, and provides that processor with all the Map-generated data associated with that key.
4. Run the user-provided Reduce() code – Reduce() is run exactly once for each K2 key produced by the Map step.
5. Produce the final output – the MapReduce system collects all the Reduce output, and sorts it by K2 to produce the final outcome.

These five steps can be logically thought of as running in sequence – each step starts only after the previous step is completed – although in practice they can be interleaved as long as the final result is not affected.

In many situations, the input data might have already been distributed ("sharded") among many different servers, in which case step 1 could sometimes be greatly simplified by assigning Map servers that would process the locally present input data. Similarly, step 3 could sometimes be sped up by assigning Reduce processors that are as close as possible to the Map-generated data they need to process.

== Logical view ==
The Map and Reduce functions of MapReduce are both defined with respect to data structured in (key, value) pairs. Map takes one pair of data with a type in one data domain, and returns a list of pairs in a different domain:

Map(k1,v1) → list(k2,v2)

The Map function is applied in parallel to every pair (keyed by k1) in the input dataset. This produces a list of pairs (keyed by k2) for each call. After that, the MapReduce framework collects all pairs with the same key (k2) from all lists and groups them together, creating one group for each key.

The Reduce function is then applied in parallel to each group, which in turn produces a collection of values in the same domain:

Reduce(k2, list (v2)) → list((k3, v3))

Each Reduce call typically produces either one key value pair or an empty return, though one call is allowed to return more than one key value pair. The returns of all calls are collected as the desired result list.

Thus the MapReduce framework transforms a list of (key, value) pairs into another list of (key, value) pairs. This behavior is different from the typical functional programming map and reduce combination, which accepts a list of arbitrary values and returns one single value that combines all the values returned by map.

It is necessary but not sufficient to have implementations of the map and reduce abstractions in order to implement MapReduce. Distributed implementations of MapReduce require a means of connecting the processes performing the Map and Reduce phases. This may be a distributed file system. Other options are possible, such as direct streaming from mappers to reducers, or for the mapping processors to serve up their results to reducers that query them.

=== Examples ===
The canonical MapReduce example counts the appearance of each word in a set of documents:

function map(String name, String document):
    // name: document name
    // document: document contents
    for each word w in document:
        emit (w, 1)

function reduce(String word, Iterator partialCounts):
    // word: a word
    // partialCounts: a list of aggregated partial counts
    sum = 0
    for each pc in partialCounts:
        sum += pc
    emit (word, sum)

Here, each document is split into words, and each word is counted by the map function, using the word as the result key. The framework puts together all the pairs with the same key and feeds them to the same call to reduce. Thus, this function just needs to sum all of its input values to find the total appearances of that word.

As another example, imagine that for a database of 1.1 billion people, one would like to compute the average number of social contacts a person has according to age. In SQL, such a query could be expressed as:

  SELECT age, AVG(contacts)
    FROM social.person
GROUP BY age
ORDER BY age

Using MapReduce, the K1 key values could be the integers 1 through 1100, each representing a batch of 1 million records, the K2 key value could be a person's age in years, and this computation could be achieved using the following functions:

function Map is
    input: integer K1 between 1 and 1100, representing a batch of 1 million social.person records
    for each social.person record in the K1 batch do
        let Y be the person's age
        let N be the number of contacts the person has
        produce one output record (Y,(N,1))
    repeat
end function

function Reduce is
    input: age (in years) Y
    for each input record (Y,(N,C)) do
        Accumulate in S the sum of N*C
        Accumulate in Cnew the sum of C
    repeat
    let A be S/Cnew
    produce one output record (Y,(A,Cnew))
end function

Note that in the Reduce function, C is the count of people having in total N contacts, so in the Map function it is natural to write C=1, since every output pair is referring to the contacts of one single person.

The MapReduce system would line up the 1100 Map processors, and would provide each with its corresponding 1 million input records. The Map step would produce 1.1 billion (Y,(N,1)) records, with Y values ranging between, say, 8 and 103. The MapReduce System would then line up the 96 Reduce processors by performing shuffling operation of the key/value pairs due to the fact that we need average per age, and provide each with its millions of corresponding input records. The Reduce step would result in the much reduced set of only 96 output records (Y,A), which would be put in the final result file, sorted by Y.

The count info in the record is important if the processing is reduced more than one time. If we did not add the count of the records, the computed average would be wrong, for example:

-- map output #1: age, quantity of contacts
10, 9
10, 9
10, 9

-- map output #2: age, quantity of contacts
10, 9
10, 9

-- map output #3: age, quantity of contacts
10, 10

If we reduce files #1 and #2, we will have a new file with an average of 9 contacts for a 10-year-old person ((9+9+9+9+9)/5):

-- reduce step #1: age, average of contacts
10, 9

If we reduce it with file #3, we lose the count of how many records we've already seen, so we end up with an average of 9.5 contacts for a 10-year-old person ((9+10)/2), which is wrong. The correct answer is 9.16̅6̅ = 55 / 6 = (9×3+9×2+10×1)/(3+2+1).

== Dataflow ==
Software framework architecture adheres to open-closed principle where code is effectively divided into unmodifiable frozen spots and extensible hot spots. The frozen spot of the MapReduce framework is a large distributed sort. The hot spots, which the application defines, are:

- an input reader
- a Map function
- a partition function
- a compare function
- a Reduce function
- an output writer

=== Input reader ===
The input reader divides the input into appropriate size 'splits' (in practice, typically, 64 MB to 128 MB) and the framework assigns one split to each Map function. The input reader reads data from stable storage (typically, a distributed file system) and generates key/value pairs.

A common example will read a directory full of text files and return each line as a record.

=== Map function ===
The Map function takes a series of key/value pairs, processes each, and generates zero or more output key/value pairs. The input and output types of the map can be (and often are) different from each other.

If the application is doing a word count, the map function would break the line into words and output a key/value pair for each word. Each output pair would contain the word as the key and the number of instances of that word in the line as the value.

=== Partition function ===
Each Map function output is allocated to a particular reducer by the application's partition function for sharding purposes. The partition function is given the key and the number of reducers and returns the index of the desired reducer.

A typical default is to hash the key and use the hash value modulo the number of reducers. It is important to pick a partition function that gives an approximately uniform distribution of data per shard for load-balancing purposes, otherwise the MapReduce operation can be held up waiting for slow reducers to finish (i.e. the reducers assigned the larger shares of the non-uniformly partitioned data).

Between the map and reduce stages, the data are shuffled (parallel-sorted / exchanged between nodes) in order to move the data from the map node that produced them to the shard in which they will be reduced. The shuffle can sometimes take longer than the computation time depending on network bandwidth, CPU speeds, data produced and time taken by map and reduce computations.

=== Comparison function ===
The input for each Reduce is pulled from the machine where the Map ran and sorted using the application's comparison function.

=== Reduce function ===
The framework calls the application's Reduce function once for each unique key in the sorted order. The Reduce can iterate through the values that are associated with that key and produce zero or more outputs.

In the word count example, the Reduce function takes the input values, sums them and generates a single output of the word and the final sum.

=== Output writer ===
The Output Writer writes the output of the Reduce to the stable storage.

== Theoretical background ==
Properties of monoids are the basis for ensuring the validity of MapReduce operations.

In the Algebird package a Scala implementation of Map/Reduce explicitly requires a monoid class type .

The operations of MapReduce deal with two types: the type A of input data being mapped, and the type B of output data being reduced.

The Map operation takes individual values of type A and produces, for each a:A a value b:B; The Reduce operation requires a binary operation • defined on values of type B; it consists of folding all available b:B to a single value.

From a basic requirements point of view, any MapReduce operation must involve the ability to arbitrarily regroup data being reduced. Such a requirement amounts to two properties of the operation •:

- associativity: (x • y) • z = x • (y • z)
- existence of neutral element e such that e • x = x • e = x for every x:B.

The second property guarantees that, when parallelized over multiple nodes, the nodes that don't have any data to process would have no impact on the result.

These two properties amount to having a monoid (B, •, e) on values of type B with operation • and with neutral element e.

There's no requirements on the values of type A; an arbitrary function A → B can be used for the Map operation. This means that we have a catamorphism A* → (B, •, e). Here A* denotes a Kleene star, also known as the type of lists over A.

The Shuffle operation per se is not related to the essence of MapReduce; it's needed to distribute calculations over the cloud.

It follows from the above that not every binary Reduce operation will work in MapReduce. Here are the counter-examples:

- building a tree from subtrees: this operation is not associative, and the result will depend on grouping;
- direct calculation of averages: avg is also not associative (and it has no neutral element); to calculate an average, one needs to calculate moments.

== Performance considerations ==
MapReduce programs are not guaranteed to be fast. The main benefit of this programming model is to exploit the optimized shuffle operation of the platform, and only having to write the Map and Reduce parts of the program. In practice, the author of a MapReduce program however has to take the shuffle step into consideration; in particular the partition function and the amount of data written by the Map function can have a large impact on the performance and scalability. Additional modules such as the Combiner function can help to reduce the amount of data written to disk, and transmitted over the network. MapReduce applications can achieve sub-linear speedups under specific circumstances.

When designing a MapReduce algorithm, the author needs to choose a good tradeoff between the computation and the communication costs. Communication cost often dominates the computation cost, and many MapReduce implementations are designed to write all communication to distributed storage for crash recovery.

In tuning performance of MapReduce, the complexity of mapping, shuffle, sorting (grouping by the key), and reducing has to be taken into account. The amount of data produced by the mappers is a key parameter that shifts the bulk of the computation cost between mapping and reducing. Reducing includes sorting (grouping of the keys) which has nonlinear complexity. Hence, small partition sizes reduce sorting time, but there is a trade-off because having a large number of reducers may be impractical. The influence of split unit size is marginal (unless chosen particularly badly, say <1MB). The gains from some mappers reading load from local disks, on average, is minor.

For processes that complete quickly, and where the data fits into main memory of a single machine or a small cluster, using a MapReduce framework usually is not effective. Since these frameworks are designed to recover from the loss of whole nodes during the computation, they write interim results to distributed storage. This crash recovery is expensive, and only pays off when the computation involves many computers and a long runtime of the computation. A task that completes in seconds can just be restarted in the case of an error, and the likelihood of at least one machine failing grows quickly with the cluster size. On such problems, implementations keeping all data in memory and simply restarting a computation on node failures or —when the data is small enough— non-distributed solutions will often be faster than a MapReduce system.

== Distribution and reliability ==
MapReduce achieves reliability by parceling out a number of operations on the set of data to each node in the network. Each node is expected to report back periodically with completed work and status updates. If a node falls silent for longer than that interval, the master node (similar to the master server in the Google File System) records the node as dead and sends out the node's assigned work to other nodes. Individual operations use atomic operations for naming file outputs as a check to ensure that there are not parallel conflicting threads running. When files are renamed, it is possible to also copy them to another name in addition to the name of the task (allowing for side-effects).

The reduce operations operate much the same way. Because of their inferior properties with regard to parallel operations, the master node attempts to schedule reduce operations on the same node, or in the same rack as the node holding the data being operated on. This property is desirable as it conserves bandwidth across the backbone network of the datacenter.

Implementations are not necessarily highly reliable. For example, in older versions of Hadoop the NameNode was a single point of failure for the distributed filesystem. Later versions of Hadoop have high availability with an active/passive failover for the "NameNode."

== Uses ==
MapReduce is useful in a wide range of applications, including distributed pattern-based searching, distributed sorting, web link-graph reversal, singular value decomposition, web access log stats, inverted index construction, document clustering, machine learning, and statistical machine translation. Moreover, the MapReduce model has been adapted to several computing environments like multi-core and many-core systems, desktop grids, multi-cluster, volunteer computing environments, dynamic cloud environments, mobile environments, and high-performance computing environments.

At Google, MapReduce was used to completely regenerate Google's index of the World Wide Web. It replaced the old ad hoc programs that updated the index and ran the various analyses. Development at Google has since moved on to technologies such as Percolator, FlumeJava and Google MillWheel that offer streaming operation and updates instead of batch processing, to allow integrating "live" search results without rebuilding the complete index.

MapReduce's stable inputs and outputs are usually stored in a distributed file system. The transient data are usually stored on local disk and fetched remotely by the reducers.

== Criticism ==
=== Lack of novelty ===
David DeWitt and Michael Stonebraker, computer scientists specializing in parallel databases and shared-nothing architectures, have been critical of the breadth of problems that MapReduce can be used for. They called its interface too low-level and questioned whether it really represents the paradigm shift its proponents have claimed it is. They challenged the MapReduce proponents' claims of novelty, citing Teradata as an example of prior art that has existed for over two decades. They also compared MapReduce programmers to CODASYL programmers, noting both are "writing in a low-level language performing low-level record manipulation." MapReduce's use of input files and lack of schema support prevents the performance improvements enabled by common database system features such as B-trees and hash partitioning, though projects such as Pig (or PigLatin), Sawzall, Apache Hive, HBase and Bigtable are addressing some of these problems.

Greg Jorgensen wrote an article rejecting these views. Jorgensen asserts that DeWitt and Stonebraker's entire analysis is groundless as MapReduce was never designed nor intended to be used as a database.

DeWitt and Stonebraker have subsequently published a detailed benchmark study in 2009 comparing performance of Hadoop's MapReduce and RDBMS approaches on several specific problems. They concluded that relational databases offer real advantages for many kinds of data use, especially on complex processing or where the data is used across an enterprise, but that MapReduce may be easier for users to adopt for simple or one-time processing tasks.

The MapReduce programming paradigm was also described in Danny Hillis's 1985 thesis intended for use on the Connection Machine, where it was called "xapping/reduction" and relied upon that machine's special hardware to accelerate both map and reduce. The dialect ultimately used for the Connection Machine, the 1986 StarLisp, had parallel *map and reduce!!, which in turn was based on the 1984 Common Lisp, which had non-parallel map and reduce built in. The tree-like approach that the Connection Machine's hypercube architecture uses to execute reduce in $O(\log n)$ time is effectively the same as the approach referred to within the Google paper as prior work.

In 2010 Google was granted what is described as a patent on MapReduce. The patent, filed in 2004, may cover use of MapReduce by open source software such as Hadoop, CouchDB, and others. In Ars Technica, an editor acknowledged Google's role in popularizing the MapReduce concept, but questioned whether the patent was valid or novel. In 2013, as part of its "Open Patent Non-Assertion (OPN) Pledge", Google pledged to only use the patent defensively. The patent is expected to expire on 23 December 2026.

=== Restricted programming framework ===
MapReduce tasks must be written as acyclic dataflow programs, i.e. a stateless mapper followed by a stateless reducer, that are executed by a batch job scheduler. This paradigm makes repeated querying of datasets difficult and imposes limitations that are felt in fields such as graph processing where iterative algorithms that revisit a single working set multiple times are the norm, as well as, in the presence of disk-based data with high latency, even the field of machine learning where multiple passes through the data are required even though algorithms can tolerate serial access to the data each pass.

== See also ==
- Bird–Meertens formalism
- Parallelization contract

=== Implementations of MapReduce ===
- Apache CouchDB
- Apache Hadoop
- Infinispan
- Riak
