= Exasol =

German database management software company

Exasol AG
- Type: Public (Aktiengesellschaft)
- Traded as: FWB: EXL
- Industry: Enterprise software & Database management & Data warehousing & OLAP
- Founded: 2000
- Headquarters: Nuremberg, Germany
- Products: In-memory database Exasol, ExaAppliance, ExaCloud
- Website: www.exasol.com

Exasol is an analytics engine, an in-memory database company headquartered in Germany, EU. It supports a wide range of use cases, from standalone data warehouse deployments to analytics acceleration and AI/ML model enablement. Its technology is based on in-memory, column-oriented, relational database management systems.

Since 2008, Exasol led the Transaction Processing Performance Council's TPC-H benchmark for analytical scenarios, in all data volume-based categories 100 GB, 300 GB, 1 TB, 3 TB, 10 TB, 30 TB and 100 TB. Exasol holds the top position in absolute performance as well as price/performance.

== Products ==
Exasol is a parallelized relational database management system (RDBMS) which runs on a cluster of standard computer hardware servers. Following the SPMD model, on each node the identical code is executed simultaneously. The data is stored in a column-oriented way and proprietary in-memory compression methods are used. The company claims that tuning efforts are not necessary since the database includes some kind of automatic self-optimization (like automatic indices, table statistics, and distributing of data).

Exasol is designed to run in memory, although data is persistently stored on disk following the ACID rules. Exasol supports the SQL Standard 2003 via interfaces like ODBC, JDBC or ADO.NET. A software development kit (SDK) is provided for native integration. For online analytical processing (OLAP) applications, the Multidimensional Expressions (MDX) extension of SQL is supported via OLE DB for OLAP and XML for Analysis.

The license model is based on the allocated RAM for the database software (per GB RAM) and independent to the physical hardware. Customers gain the maximal performance if their compressed active data fits into that licensed RAM, but it can also be much larger.

Exasol has implemented a so-called cluster operating system (EXACluster OS). It is based on Linux and provides a runtime environment and storage layer for the RDBMS, employing a proprietary, cluster-based file system (ExaStorage). Cluster management algorithms are provided like failover mechanisms or automatic cluster installation.

In-database analytics is supported. Exasol integrates support to run Lua, Java, Python and GNU R scripts in parallel inside user defined functions (UDFs) within the DBMS' SQL pipeline.

== See also ==
- Shared-nothing architecture
- Column-oriented database
- In-memory database
- SQL(:2008)
- (R)OLAP, i.e. MDX over ODBO or XMLA
- Business analytics
- Predictive analytics
