= Kyvos =

American business intelligence company

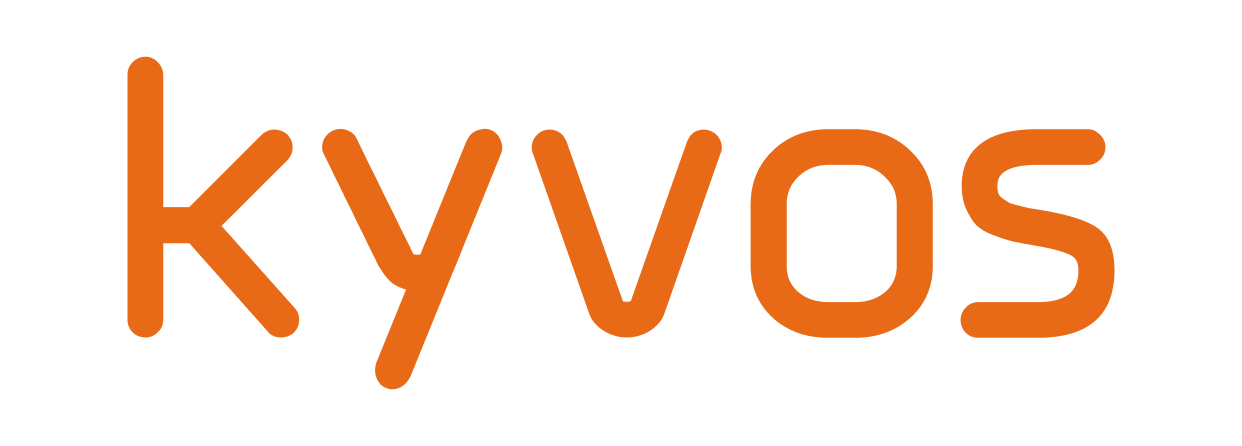
- Type: Private
- Founded: June 30, 2015; 11 years ago
- Founder: Praveen Kankariya
- Headquarters: San Francisco, California, U.S.
- Products: Semantic layer Stable release: Kyvos 2026.6; License: Proprietary
- Website: kyvosinsights.com

Kyvos is a semantic layer for AI and BI, developed by an American privately held company named Kyvos Insights and launched officially in June 2015. The company, headquartered in San Francisco, California, was founded by Praveen Kankariya.

== Product ==
Kyvos semantic layer sits between enterprise data platforms and the tools that query them, including AI agents, analytics applications and business intelligence tools. Kyvos centrally defines and governs business definitions, dimensions, attributes, hierarchies, metrics, and business logic.

For AI, Kyvos provides context by combining semantics with unstructured knowledge and business relationships.

== Technology ==
=== AI context ===
For each AI query, Kyvos assembles business context from its semantic models, unstructured knowledge integration and context graph.

=== Semantic models ===
Kyvos semantic models define dimensions, attributes, hierarchies, metrics and calculations, and assign business names and descriptions to data. Models can be authored in a visual designer or as code, with support for versioning and CI/CD workflows. BI tools and AI agents query the same semantic models, so metric definitions and business logic are applied consistently across both.

=== Unstructured knowledge integration ===
Kyvos converts unstructured knowledge, such as policies, procedures and product documentation, into vector embeddings. For each query, it retrieves the relevant knowledge from these embeddings using retrieval-augmented generation (RAG). The retrieved knowledge becomes part of the business context that Kyvos assembles for the AI agent or application.

=== Context graph ===
Kyvos' context graph defines business concepts and how they relate. It consists of nodes, including business entities, KPIs, business concepts and external entities, connected by relations that can carry rules, causal paths and weights. Business entity and KPI nodes are derived from the dimensions and measures of semantic models, while external entity nodes represent sources outside the model. AI agents traverse the graph to identify the drivers of a KPI, supporting root cause analysis and why-type questions.

=== Agent enablement ===
Kyvos provides a workspace to configure business context for an AI use case, along with the analytics tools that AI agents use to reason and act.

Users select the semantic models, context graphs and unstructured knowledge sources that apply, and add business rules and verified example queries that guide how questions are answered. Tools that AI agents can call include SQL generation and execution, knowledge lookup, context graph lookup, code generation and web search.

=== Analytics agent ===
Dialogs is Kyvos’ business analytics agent, launched in May 2025. It interprets business questions, resolves them against the context in an AI Space and runs the required queries. Dialogs explains the drivers behind a result, supports multi-turn analysis and shows how each answer was derived. Other AI agents can call Dialogs through MCP, and it is available in Microsoft Teams and Slack.

=== Governance and security ===
Kyvos semantic layer maintains data access rules alongside business metrics and calculation logic. Its authentication and authorization component, AuthK, supports single sign-on and the assignment of roles to users and groups to control access to data, reports and features. It also includes data masking, encryption of data at rest and in transit, and auditing and logging of activity.

=== Analytics engine ===
Kyvos uses distributed query execution, smart aggregation, caching, and elastic compute to process queries on large datasets.

=== Open standards ===
In August 2026, Kyvos announced compatibility with Apache Ossie, an open-source project for standardizing semantic model exchange across analytics, AI and BI platforms.

=== AI and BI integrations ===
Kyvos provides a model context protocol (MCP) server for connecting AI agents and applications to Kyvos. It also supports integration with the LangChain framework.

Kyvos connects to Power BI, Tableau, Looker, Strategy (formerly MicroStrategy) and Excel through dedicated connectors. BI tools can also connect to Kyvos using SQL, MDX and DAX.

Kyvos also provides REST and Java APIs for programmatic access from other applications.

=== Supported cloud data platforms ===
Kyvos supports Amazon Web Services (AWS), Cloudera, Google Cloud, Microsoft Azure, Redshift, Snowflake, Databricks, and Google BigQuery.

== See also ==
- Semantic layer
- OSSIE
