= Mosha Pasumansky =

Information Technologist

Mosha Pasumansky is one of the inventors of the MultiDimensional eXpressions (MDX) language, a query language for online analytical processing (OLAP) databases. Pasumansky is also one of the architects of the Microsoft Analysis Services, and an OLAP expert.

Mosha Pasumansky is well known in the OLAP community for his Microsoft OLAP information website which contains a collection of technical articles and other resources related to Microsoft OLAP and Analysis Services. He also has a blog dedicated to MDX and Analysis Services. He spoke at Microsoft conferences such as TechEd and PASS, and he published the book Fast Track to MDX.

In December 2009, Pasumansky shifted his focus to Bing, the Microsoft Search Engine. He is no longer maintaining his active stewardship of the BI Community.

From May 2011 to July 2021, Pasumansky worked at Google on the Dremel and BigQuery systems.

Since July 2021, Pasumansky assumed the role of CTO at Firebolt Analytics, an Israel-founded startup aiming to revolutionize the world of data analytics
