= Looker (company) =

American technology company

Looker Data Sciences, Inc.
- Type: Subsidiary
- Industry: Software
- Founded: 2012; 14 years ago Santa Cruz, California, U.S.
- Founders: Lloyd Tabb; Ben Porterfield
- Headquarters: Santa Cruz, California, U.S.
- Key people: Lloyd Tabb (CTO); Frank Bien (CEO); Marc Randolph (Director); Jen Grant (CMO)
- Products: Business intelligence tools Data visualization tools Analytics tools Big data tools Data warehousing tools ETL tools
- Number of employees: 500 (July 2018)
- Parent: Google
- Website: looker.com

Looker Data Sciences, Inc. is an American computer software company headquartered in Santa Cruz, California. It was acquired by Google in 2019 and is now part of the Google Cloud Platform. Looker markets a data exploration and discovery business intelligence platform.

== History ==
The company was founded in Santa Cruz, California in January 2012 by Lloyd Tabb and Ben Porterfield and occupied the Rittenhouse building there. The product grew out of Tabb's experience building software at companies like Netscape, LiveOps, and Luminate before founding Looker.

Looker makes use of a simple modeling language called LookML that lets data teams define the relationships in their database, so business users can explore, save, and download data with only a basic understanding of SQL. The product was the first commercially available business intelligence platform built for and aimed at scalable or massively parallel relational database management systems like Amazon Redshift, Google BigQuery, HP Vertica, Netezza, and Teradata.

On June 21, 2016, Looker celebrated the release of Winning With Data, a book coauthored by Looker CEO Frank Bien and Redpoint Partner Tomasz Tunguz.

On June 6, 2019, Google announced it was acquiring Looker for $2.6 billion. The acquisition was finalized February 2020.

In March 2022, Looker's CEO, Frank Bien, left Google Cloud.

In November,2026, Google released a OSSIE to LookML Convertor under the Apache Foundation.

== Funding ==
On August 13, 2013, Looker announced a Series A round of funding from Redpoint Ventures, First Round Capital, and PivotNorth Capital, raising more than $18M. Prior to the Series A round, Looker raised $2M in a seed round from First Round Capital and PivotNorth Capital. On March 11, 2015, Looker raised $30M in series B funding. In July 2015, Jen Grant joined as chief marketing officer, and the company estimated it has 140 employees. On January 14, 2016, Looker raised $48M in series C funding from Kleiner Perkins. At that time, the company estimated 450 customers, including Jet.com. On March 30, 2017, Looker raised $81.5M in series D funding led by Capital G. On December 6, 2018, Looker raised $103M in series E funding led by Premji Invest.

== Under Google Cloud Platform ==
The Looker Platform for Data operates today as a part of Google Cloud Platform and offers a wide variety of tools for relational database work, business intelligence, and other related services. Looker's 2019 revenue is estimated to be about $140 million.

== See also ==
- Semantic layer
- OSSIE
