= Microsoft Power BI =

Business analytics service by Microsoft

- Developer: Microsoft
- Release: July 11, 2011; 15 years ago

Stable release(s) [±]
- Windows: October 2026 Update (2.159.1231) / November 2, 2026; 12 days ago
- Android: 2.2.260616 (Build 21311025) / June 17, 2026; 4 months ago
- iOS (Note: Including iPadOS and watchOS): 38.6 / October 25, 2026; 20 days ago
- M365 ecosystem: 1.20 / May 7, 2026; 6 months ago
- Operating system: Windows 10, 11; Android 8+; iOS 18+ (Note: Including iPadOS) watchOS 4+; web Discontinued; iOS 17 (2026); iOS 16 (2025); iOS 15 (2024); Windows 8.1, iOS 14, Android 5, 6, 7 (2023); iOS 12, 13 (2022); iOS 11 (2020); iOS 10 (2019); Android KitKat (2018)
- Type: Data visualization Business intelligence
- License: Proprietary
- Website: powerbi.microsoft.com

Microsoft Power BI (PBI) is an interactive data visualization, database management, and data modeling software product developed by Microsoft with a primary focus on business intelligence (BI). It is part of the Microsoft Power Platform.

Power BI is a collection of software services, apps, and connectors that work together to turn various sources of data into static and interactive data visualizations. Data may be input by reading directly from a database, webpage, PDF, or structured files such as spreadsheets, CSV, XML, JSON, XLSX, and SharePoint.

== General ==
Power BI provides cloud-based BI (business intelligence) services, known as "Power BI Services", along with a desktop-based interface, called "Power BI Desktop". It provides data warehouse capabilities including data preparation, data mining, and interactive dashboards.

In March 2016, Microsoft released an additional service called Power BI Embedded on its Azure cloud platform. One main differentiator of the product is the ability to load custom visualizations.

== History ==
The software was originally used as Power Pivot and Power Query in Microsoft Excel. This application was originally conceived by Thierry D'Hers and Amir Netz of the SQL Server Reporting Services team at Microsoft. It was originally designed by Ron George in the summer of 2010 and named Project Crescent. Project Crescent was initially available for public download on 11 July 2011, bundled with SQL Server Codename Denali. Later renamed Power BI it was then unveiled by Microsoft in September 2013 as Power BI for Office 365. The first release of Power BI was based on the Microsoft Excel-based add-ins: Power Query, Power Pivot and Power View. With time, Microsoft also added many additional features like question and answers, enterprise-level data connectivity, and security options via Power BI Gateways. Power BI was first released to the general public on 24 July 2015. It has several versions for desktop, web, and mobile app.

On 14 April 2015, Microsoft announced that they had acquired the Canadian company Datazen, to "complement Power BI, our cloud-based business analytics service, rounding out our mobile capabilities for customers who need a mobile BI solution implemented on-premises and optimized for SQL Server." Most of the 'visuals' in Power BI started life as Datazen visuals.

== Key components ==
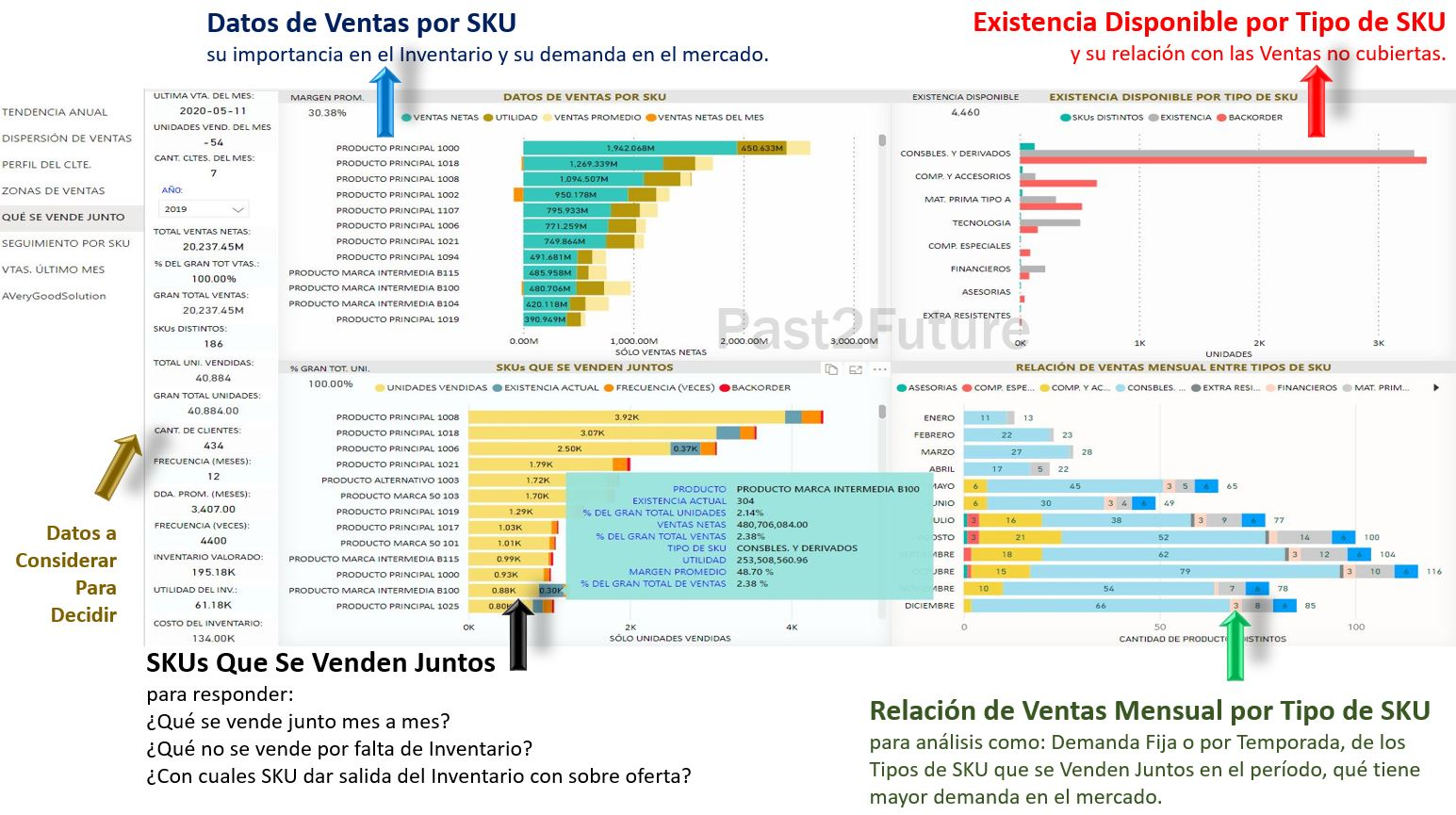
Example of a screenshot from the software

Key components of the Power BI ecosystem are as follows:

Power BI Desktop
The Windows desktop-based application for PCs, primarily for designing and publishing reports to the service.
Power BI Service
The SaaS-based (software as a service) online service. This was formerly known as Power BI for Office 365, now referred to as PowerBI.com or simply Power BI.
Power BI Mobile Apps
Power BI Mobile apps are for Android and iOS devices, as well as for Windows phones and tablets.
Power BI Gateway
Gateways are used to sync external data in and out of Power BI and are required for automated refreshes. In enterprise mode, it can also be used by Microsoft Power Automate (previously called Flows) and PowerApps in Office 365.
Power BI Embedded
Power BI REST API can be used to build dashboards and reports into the custom applications that serve Power BI users and non-Power BI users.
Power BI Report Server
An on-premises Power BI is a reporting product for companies that choose not to store data in the cloud-based Power BI Service.
Power BI Premium
Capacity-based offering that includes flexibility to publish reports broadly across an enterprise without requiring recipients to be licensed individually per user. This provides greater scale and performance than shared capacity in the Power BI Service.
Power BI Visuals Marketplace
A marketplace of custom visuals and R-powered visuals.
Power BI Dataflow
A Power Query implementation in the cloud that can be used for data transformations to make a common Power BI Semantic Model, which can then be made available for report developers through Microsoft's Common Data Service. For example, it can be used as an alternative to doing transformations in SSAS and may ensure that several report developers use data that has been transformed similarly.
Power BI Semantic Model
A Power BI Semantic Model (formerly Dataset) can work as a collection of data for use in Power BI reports, and can either be connected to or imported into a Power BI Report. A semantic model can be connected to and get its source data through one or more dataflows. In October 2026, announced it's support for Apache OSSIE by releasing Apache Ossie Microsoft Converter
Power BI Datamart
Within Power BI, the datamart is a container that combines Power BI Dataflows, datasets, and a type of data mart or data warehouse (in the form of an Azure SQL Database) into the same interface. The interface then has the possibility of being a single place for the administration of both the ETL layer (Dataflow), an intermediary data mart (with for instance storage of star schemas, dimension tables, fact tables), and finally the modeling layer (dataset).
Power BI Datahub
A data hub for discovering Power BI datasets within an organization's Power BI Service so that datasets may be reused from one central location. It offers details on the things as well as an access point for working with them, such as building reports on top of them, utilizing them with Excel's Analyze feature, accessing settings, controlling permissions, and more.

=== Power Query ===
ETL processes in both the web and desktop versions of Power BI are facilitated in Power Query through built-in connectors to pull data from a wide variety of sources. Power Query provides a GUI which allows users to perform many common data preparation operations without needing to write code, though more advanced operations may be performed through expressions written in the M formula language.

== Licenses ==
Power BI has several different licenses depending on your specific use case. It should be noted however that, as of June 2026, a work or school email is needed to sign up for a license to enable development or publishing. This includes creating dashboards, publishing or sharing dashboards, and creating the underlying semantic models.

=== User licenses ===
Currently, Microsoft Power BI offers free, Pro, and Premium Per User licenses. Users who own or administer their Microsoft Tenant are allowed a single developer license for free. Free users must be part of an organization with a Power BI license. They can consume reports, and can also build, but not publish. In practice, creators need at least a pro license ($14.00/month) in order to publish reports, and premium users ($24.00/month) can publish in the same manner as a pro license, but also have more features available for developing.

=== Workspace licenses ===
Premium capacity refers to the license of the workspace, not the licenses of its users or creators. Also, access to several features, functionalities, and kinds of content that are exclusively accessible through premium is made possible with a Power BI Premium per-user license. Premium per user is a special workspace license which was added in November 2020, and can be a more affordable alternative to premium workspace licenses for organizations with few users which have advanced analytical requirements.

== Paginated reports ==
Paginated reports for Power BI, which can be built with Power BI Report Builder, are a special type of SSRS reports with pagination formatting which can give better control of the layout of reports which need to be printed to paper or PDF. This is in contrast to regular Power BI reports which instead are optimized for presentation or interactivity and exploration on a screen. Paginated reports can, as of 2022, not be made with the regular Power BI Desktop report builder software. Instead, the standalone Power BI Report Builder has to be used, which can be viewed as a descendant of the SQL Server Reporting Services (SSRS) Microsoft Report Builder for Microsoft SQL Server introduced in 2004. It is also similar to the Report Designer in SQL Server Data Tools.

Power BI Paginated reports are saved in the Report Definition Language (.rdl file format), as opposed to the .pbix file of regular Power BI reports or the recently introduced .pbir format. The RDL format is based on XML and was proposed by Microsoft as a benchmark for defining reports with SSRS.

Paginated reports may be more suitable than regular Power BI reports. They may be used for printing invoices or other reports that require repeated printouts with a similar layout but different content. They are also useful for printing reports where text might otherwise overflow or be cut off by scrollbars.

== See also ==
- Semantic layer
- OSSIE
- Kyvos
