= Data Analysis Expressions =

Formula and data query language

Data Analysis Expressions (DAX) is the native formula and query language for Microsoft PowerPivot, Power BI Desktop and SQL Server Analysis Services (SSAS) Tabular models. DAX includes some of the functions that are used in Excel formulas with additional functions that are designed to work with relational data and perform dynamic aggregation. It is, in part, an evolution of the Multidimensional Expression (MDX) language developed by Microsoft for Analysis Services multidimensional models (often called cubes) combined with Excel formula functions. It is designed to be simple and easy to learn, while exposing the power and flexibility of PowerPivot and SSAS tabular models.

== Background ==
The Data Analysis Expressions (DAX) language provides a specialized syntax for querying Analysis Services tabular model. DAX is not a programming language. DAX is primarily a formula language and is also a query language. You can use DAX to define custom calculations for Calculated Columns, Measures, Calculated Tables, Calculation Groups, Custom Format Strings, and filter expressions in role-based security in Tabular models. The same Analysis Services engine for Tabular models is also used in Power BI and Power Pivot for Excel. Power BI also uses DAX for conditional formatting expressions and other dynamic properties of visual components.

== History ==
DAX was developed by the SQL Server Analysis Services team at Microsoft as part of Project Gemini and released in 2009 with the first version of the PowerPivot for Excel 2010 Add-in. Both DAX and MDX can be used to query PowerPivot and Tabular models, however only MDX may be used to query multidimensional SSAS models (cubes) in versions of SSAS up to SQL Server 2012 RTM. Future versions of SSAS (both multidimensional & tabular models) will support DAX natively. 2016 marks a significant improvement with the rapid adoption of Microsoft Power BI and SQL Server 2016. Power BI is a subscription-based self-service analytic tool and Power BI Desktop is a desktop analytic and report authoring application. SQL Server 2016 includes a new release of SQL Analysis Services Tabular with many improvements over previous versions. Enhancements to the DAX language after 2015 include support for calculated tables, automatic date table generation, variables and a total of 340 functions.

== DAX data types ==
DAX can compute values for seven data types:

- Integer (called Whole Number in Power BI, a signed 64-bit integer)
- Decimal (called Decimal Number in Power BI, a double-precision (64-bit) floating-point number)
- Currency (called Fixed Decimal Number in Power BI, a number with four decimal places and stored internally as an integer divided by 10,000)
- DateTime (called Date/time, Date or Time in Power BI, stored internally as a floating-point number where the integer part represents the date in number of days since 30 December 1899 and the decimal part represents the time in terms of its fraction of a day)
- Boolean (called True/false in Power BI, either the value TRUE or the value FALSE)
- String (called Text in Power BI, a sequence of Unicode (UTF-16) characters, comparisons between strings in DAX are case-insensitive)
- Variant (the type given to a DAX expression that might return a value of different types depending on the conditions)

The BLOB (binary large object) data type is managed by the Tabular model but cannot be directly manipulated by DAX expressions.

DAX has a powerful type-handling system so that you do not have to worry much about data types. When you write a DAX expression, the resulting type is based on the type of the terms used in the expression and on the operator used. Type conversion happens automatically during the expression evaluation. However, if an expression might return different data types depending on the conditions, then the data type of the expression is defined as Variant.
