= Know Labs =

Know Labs, Inc.
- Company type: Public
- Traded as: OTCQB: KNWN
- Industry: Medical Diagnostics
- Founded: 1998
- Founder: Ron Erickson
- Headquarters: Seattle, WA, United States
- Key people: Ron Erickson, Phil Bosua, Dr. James Anderson, Leo Trautwein
- Products: ChromaID, Bio-RFID
- Number of employees: 10-50
- Website: www.knowlabs.co

Know Labs, Inc is a US-based medical device company that creates non-invasive health monitoring systems using radio-microwave spectroscopy to identify and measure molecules in vivo, its first commercial-bound product being sensor technology optimized for blood glucose measurement. Know Labs is a public company whose shares trade under the stock symbol KNW.

== History ==
Visualant was founded in 1998 by Ron Erickson. The technology was originally developed by Tom Furness and Brian Showengerdt over a period of seven years at Furness's private research lab 'RATLab'.

Visualant acquired TransTech Systems of Aurora, Oregon in 2010. TransTech distributes security products and systems to security and law enforcement industries.

In May 2012, Visualant entered into a joint development contract, and licensing agreement with Sumitomo Precision Products Co., Ltd. focusing on the commercialization of the SPM technology. The following year, the United States Patent and Trademark Office granted its sixth Visualant a patent titled "Method, apparatus, and article to facilitate distributed evaluation of objects using electromagnetic energy." Later in 2013, Visualant partnered with Intellectual Ventures to further the development of intellectual property through Intellectual Venture's 'Inventor Network'.

In 2018, Visualant, Incorporated announced a name change to Know Labs, Inc.

== Awards and recognition ==
In February 2013, Visualant won the Green Photonics category of the 2013 Prism Awards for Photonics Innovation for its ChromaID technology.
