= Superset (disambiguation) =

Superset may refer to:

- Superset in mathematics and set theory
- SuperSet Software, a group of friends who later became part of the early Novell
- Superset (strength training), for supersets in strength training
- Apache Superset, a data exploration and visualization web application
