= Meta Data Services =

Meta Data Services was an object-oriented repository technology that could be integrated with enterprise information systems or with applications that process metadata.

Meta Data Services was originally named the Microsoft Repository and was delivered as part of Visual Basic 5 in 1997. The original intent was to provide an extensible programmatic interface via Microsoft's OLE Automation to metadata describing software artifacts and to facilitate metadata interchange between software tools from multiple vendors. The Repository became part of SQL Server 7 and a number of SQL Server tools took dependencies on the Repository, especially the OLAP features. In 1998, Microsoft joined the Meta Data Coalition and transferred management of the underlying Open Information Model (OIM) of the Repository to the standards body. The Repository was renamed Meta Data Services with the release of SQL Server 2000. Support for Meta Data Services was withdrawn from support with the release of SQL Server 2005.

A number of Microsoft technologies used Meta Data Services as a native store for object definitions or as a platform for deploying metadata. One of the ways in which Microsoft SQL Server 2000 used Meta Data Services was to store versioned DTS Packages. In Microsoft Visual Studio Meta Data Services supported the exchange of model data with other development tools.

Users could use Meta Data Services for their own purposes: as a component of an integrated information system, as a native store for custom applications that process metadata, or as a storage and management service for sharing reusable models. Users could also extend Meta Data Services to provide support for new tools for resale or customize it to satisfy internal tool requirements
