= DBT =

DBT may refer to:

- Danish Board of Technology, a technology assessment institution in Denmark
- data build tool (dbt), a data analytics tool
- .dbt, the extension of a DBase file format
- DBT (gene)
- DBT Online Inc. a US data mining company
- Department for Business and Trade, United Kingdom
- Department of Biotechnology, India
- Design-basis tornado, a type of Design-basis event consider in the design of a nuclear facility
- Deutscher Bundestag, the lower house of the bicameral parliament of Germany
- Dialectical behavior therapy, a psychotherapy for psychiatric illnesses such as borderline personality disorder
- Dibenzothiophene, a chemical compound
- Dibutyltryptamine, a psychedelic drug
- Digital breast tomosynthesis, a breast X-ray technique
- Direct Benefit Transfer, a Government of India designed model to build public money subsidies delivery trail
- Disney Branded Television
- Double-blind trial, a methodology for scientific experiments
- Drive-By Truckers, an alt-country/rock band
- Dynamic Binary Translation, a technique often used by emulator software
- Debre Tabor Airport, airport in northern Ethiopia (IATA: DBT)
