= KJEO =

KJEO may refer to:

- KJEO-LD, a low-power television station (channel 33) licensed to serve Fresno, California, United States
- KBNK-LD, a low-power television station (channel 14, virtual 39) licensed to serve Fresno, which held the call signs KJEO-LP or KJEO-LD from 2000 to 2023
- KGPE, a television station (channel 47) licensed to serve Fresno, which held the call sign KJEO from 1953 to 2000
