= Apache Drill =

Open-source software framework

- Developer: Apache Software Foundation
- Release: May 19, 2015; 11 years ago
- Stable release: 1.22.0 / June 28, 2025; 16 months ago
- Written in: Java
- Operating system: Cross-platform
- License: Apache License 2.0
- Website: drill.apache.org
- Repository: Drill Repository

Apache Drill is an open-source software framework that supports data-intensive distributed applications for interactive analysis of large-scale datasets. Built chiefly by contributions from developers from MapR, Drill is inspired by Google's Dremel system. Drill is an Apache top-level project.

Drill supports a variety of NoSQL databases and file systems, including Alluxio, HBase, MongoDB, MapR-DB, HDFS, MapR-FS, Amazon S3, Azure Blob Storage, Google Cloud Storage, Swift, NAS and local files. A single query can join data from multiple datastores.

Drill's datastore-aware optimizer automatically restructures a query plan to leverage the datastore's internal processing capabilities. In addition, Drill supports data locality, if Drill and the datastore are on the same nodes.

Tom Shiran is the founder of the Apache Drill Project. It was designated an Apache Software Foundation top-level project in December 2016.

== Features ==
One explicitly stated design goal is that Drill is able to scale to 10,000 servers or more and to be able to process petabytes of data and trillions of records in seconds.

- Schema-free JSON document model similar to MongoDB and Elasticsearch, without requiring a formal schema to be declared
- Industry-standard APIs: ANSI SQL, ODBC/JDBC, RESTful APIs
- Extremely user and developer friendly
- Pluggable architecture enables connectivity to multiple datastores
- Version 1.9 added dynamic user-defined functions
- Version 1.11 added cryptographic-related functions and PCAP file format support

== Back-end support ==
Drill is primarily focused on non-relational datastores, including Apache Hadoop text files, NoSQL, and cloud storage. A notable feature also includes in situ querying of local JSON and Apache Parquet files. Some additional datastores that it supports include:

- All Hadoop distributions (HDFS API 2.3+), including Apache Hadoop, MapR, CDH and Amazon EMR
- NoSQL: MongoDB, Apache HBase, Apache Cassandra
- Online Analytical Processing: Apache Kudu, Apache Druid, OpenTSDB
- Cloud storage: Amazon S3, Google Cloud Storage, Azure Blob Storage, Swift, IBM Cloud Object Storage
- Diverse data formats, including Apache Avro, Apache Parquet and JSON
- RDBMs storage plugins (Using JDBC to connect to MySQL, PostgreSQL, and others)

A new datastore can be added by developing a storage plugin. Drill's "schema-free" JSON data model enables it to query non-relational datastores in-situ .

== Front-end support ==
Drill itself can be queried via JDBC, ODBC, or REST through a variety of methods and languages including Python and Java. The default install includes a web interface allowing end-users to execute ANSI SQL directly and export data tables as CSV files without any programming.

The dashboard library, Apache Superset, is particularly well suited for visualization of data queried with Drill.

== See also ==
- Cloud computing
- Big data
- Data Intensive Computing

== Papers ==
Some papers influenced the birth and design. Here is a partial list:

- 2005 From Databases to Dataspaces: A New Abstraction for Information Management, the authors highlight the need for storage systems to accept all data formats and to provide APIs for data access that evolve based on the storage system's understanding of the data.
- 2010 Dremel: Interactive Analysis of Web-Scale Datasets
