= Dundas Data Visualization =

Software company in Canada

Dundas Data Visualization Inc.
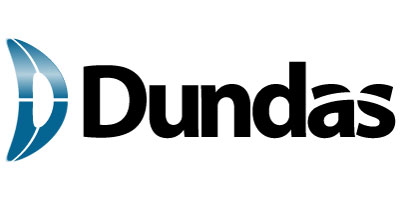
- Company type: Private
- Industry: Dashboard Software, Data Visualization and Business Intelligence Consulting Services
- Headquarters: Formerly Toronto, Ontario, Canada
- Products: (Current) Dundas BI, (Previous) Dundas Dashboard, Dundas Consulting Professional Services Dundas Chart for .NET, Dundas Gauge for .NET, Dundas Map for .NET, Dundas Chart for SQL Server Reporting Services, Dundas Gauge for SQL Server Reporting Services, Dundas Map for SQL Server Reporting Services, Dundas Calendar for SQL Server Reporting Services, Dundas Chart for Microsoft SharePoint, Dundas Gauge for Microsoft SharePoint
- Website: dundas.com

Dundas Data Visualization, Inc. was a software company known for developing Dundas BI, an enterprise-level dashboard and business intelligence platform. In 2022, Dundas was acquired by insightsoftware, and its technology now forms a core part of Logi Symphony, a unified embedded analytics platform launched by insightsoftware in 2023.

== Products ==
Dundas originally developed a suite of .NET-based data visualization components, including Dundas Chart, Dundas Gauge, and Dundas Map, for both ASP.NET and Windows Forms applications. These tools allowed developers to embed advanced charting, gauge, and mapping functionality directly into software. The company later expanded to support SQL Server Reporting Services (SSRS) and was among the first to offer custom visualization components for SharePoint.

In 2007, Microsoft acquired several of Dundas’s .NET components, incorporating them into the .NET Framework, SQL Server Reporting Services, and other Microsoft platforms. Dundas continued to operate independently and shifted its focus to end-to-end dashboard and BI solutions.

In 2008, the company released Dundas Dashboard, one of the first commercial applications built using Microsoft Silverlight. It provided a web-based platform for designing, managing, and deploying interactive dashboards and scorecards. Dundas Dashboard was officially retired in 2019.

Following the deprecation of Silverlight, Dundas released Dundas BI in 2014, a browser-based, HTML5 business intelligence platform that provided self-service dashboards, ad hoc reporting, and data analytics. Dundas BI was designed as a customizable and extensible platform aimed at both enterprise and embedded analytics use cases.

In 2022, Dundas was acquired by insightsoftware, and its technology was integrated into Logi Symphony, a unified embedded analytics platform launched in 2023 that also incorporates components from Logi Composer.

== See also ==
- .NET Framework
- Dundas BI
