= KJEO-LD =

Television station in Fresno, California

- Fresno, California; United States
- Channels: Digital: 33 (UHF); Virtual: 33

Programming
- Affiliations: See § Subchannels

Ownership
- Owner: Cocola Broadcasting

History
- Former call signs: K34AV (1985–1997); KSDI-LP (1997–2016); KGOF-LP (2016–2020); KGOF-LD (2020–2023)
- Former channel number: Analog: 34 (UHF)
- Former affiliations: The Box; Urban America Television (until May 2006); Shop At Home (May−June 2006); NOYZ; Pursuit Channel; Mega TV (2011–2020); Telemax (2020–2021)
- Call sign meaning: Derived from the former KJEO, now KGPE

Technical information
- Licensing authority: FCC
- Facility ID: 23274
- Class: LD
- ERP: 4.3 kW
- HAAT: 577.1 m (1,893 ft)
- Transmitter coordinates: 37°4′26.8″N 119°25′56.8″W

Links
- Public license information: LMS

KJEO-LD (channel 33) is a low-power television station in Fresno, California, United States. It is owned by Cocola Broadcasting.

== History ==
The station was noted for its commitment to local programming. Originally broadcasting on channel 34, the then-KSDI-LP invited individuals and organizations to produce their own television programs. Similar to many public-access cable television networks, many locals became a part of the programming on KSDI-LP.

The station was formerly an affiliate of Urban America Television and Shop at Home. The previous affiliation, Shop At Home, was temporary, due to the Shop At Home network ceasing broadcasting on June 21, 2006. The network it replaced, Urban America Television, folded a month earlier.

The station changed its call sign to KJEO-LD on July 20, 2023.

== Subchannels ==
The station's digital signal is multiplexed:

Subchannels of KJEO-LD
Channel	Video	Short name	Programming
32.6	1080i	HmongTV	Hmong TV
32.13	480i	TVESF	Televisión Espíritu Santo y Fuego
32.14	480i	Mana	Mana Visión
