= Panorama Software =

Software company in Canada

- Company type: Privately held company
- Industry: Business intelligence software
- Founded: 1993 in Israel
- Founder: Rony Ross founded the original co. in 1993; assets were sold to Microsoft in 1996; the current company was founded in 2003 by Janice Anderson and Rony Ross
- Headquarters: Toronto, Canada
- Key people: Eynav Azarya, CEO; Rony Ross, Executive Chairman and CTO
- Products: Novaview, Necto
- Website: www.panorama.com

Panorama Software is a Canadian software and consulting company specializing in business intelligence. The company was founded by Rony Ross in Israel in 1993; it relocated its headquarters to Toronto, Canada in 2003. Panorama sold its online analytical processing (OLAP) technology to Microsoft in 1996, which was built into Microsoft OLAP Services and later SQL Server Analysis Services, an integrated component of Microsoft SQL Server.

== Products ==
The company's main product is a business intelligence (BI) suite named Necto. Before 2011 it had a product called NovaView. Necto offers data mining and report generation, allowing custom views of the data without having to wait to run a report. It lets users create collaborative "workboards" and visual presentations. Necto is a BI application based upon understanding of user behavior, one-click reporting, and collaborative decision making. It supports social sharing of data, similar to sharing found on consumer oriented social networking sites. Data analysis is treated as "conversations" which can themselves be followed and analyzed. Panorama encourages Necto enterprise users to form cross-departmental teams based on data research behaviors. It allows tracking of user behavior and making corresponding adjustments.

Necto includes analytics, custom reporting, intuitive dashboards, and integration with Microsofttechnology. It can use data sources including spreadsheets, in-memory, OLAP, or relational databases. Integration on Microsoft Azure and optimization with Microsoft SQL Server 2012 platform is also available. Necto integrates with SharePoint. It can be scaled up to manage thousands of users and several terabytes of data.

== Panorama and Microsoft ==
Panorama Software is the original developer of the online analytical processing technology that Microsoft acquired in 1996 and rebranded as SQL Server Analysis Services, a component of Microsoft SQL Server. Since this acquisition, Panorama sells support as a Microsoft Gold ISV Competency partner.
