= R:Base =

Computer software program

- Original author: Wayne Erickson
- Developers: MicroRim, Inc.
- Release: 1981; 45 years ago
- Stable release: 11
- Operating system: Microsoft Windows
- Platform: PC
- Type: Relational database
- License: Proprietary
- Website: rbase.com

R:BASE (or RBASE) is a relational database program for the PC created by Wayne Erickson in 1981. Erickson and his brother, Ron Erickson, incorporated the company, MicroRim, Inc. to sell the database, MicroRIM, on November 13, 1981.

In June 1998, A. Razzak Memon, President & CEO of R:BASE Technologies, Inc. (a privately held company in Murrysville, Pennsylvania) acquired the R:BASE products from Abacus Software Group. Since 1998, R:BASE is available as R:BASE for Windows v6.1a, v7.1, v7.5, v7.6, Turbo V-8, v9.1, v9.5 (32/64) for Windows, R:Base X, and now R:Base X.5.

== History ==
=== Founding ===
Created by Wayne Erickson in 1981, the original R:Base database was written on a Heathkit CP/M computer that Erickson built at home. On November 13, 1981, Erickson and his brother, Ron Erickson, incorporated the company, MicroRim, Inc. to sell the database, MicroRIM. "RIM" was an acronym for Relational Information Management, a mainframe database developed by NASA's IPAD project team, which included Erikson at Boeing Computer Services. The team and NASA colleagues received a NASA award for the project, which was used by NASA to track Space Shuttle heat shield tiles.

The earliest version released by MicroRim was called R:Base 4000 and was released in 1983. It worked with early versions of Microsoft MS-DOS or IBM PC DOS (version 2 or above). It shipped with a binder-type manual and the program on 360KB floppy disks. As the system was DOS-based, the interface was entirely text-based with the exception of DOS line-draw characters.

Privately funded and ultimately venture backed, the MicroRim database products achieved significant market share in the mid-1980s in what some called the "database wars" between R:Base and the market share leader, Ashton-Tate's dBASE. One MicroRim ad stated "R-way versus D-hardway," a jab at the less relational dBASE architecture. MicroRim adhered to the rules of the father of relational database technology, Edgar F. Codd and prided itself on the elegance of its code.

In the mid-1980s, when Microsoft did not have their own database, it obtained a license to resell R:BASE in Europe to have a full suite of software products. By 1989 Microrim's product was the second best-selling database software in the world. Computer Intelligence estimated in 1987 that Microrim had 9% of the Fortune 1000 PC database market, second to Ashton-Tate's 67%. A 1990 American Institute of Certified Public Accountants member survey found that 10% of respondents used R:Base as their database, in third place behind Lotus 1-2-3 (25%) and dBASE (16%).

=== 1990s ===
In June 1998, R:BASE Technologies, Inc. (a privately held company in Murrysville, Pennsylvania, USA) acquired the R:BASE products from Abacus Software Group.

=== Recent years ===
Some of the features included, and continue to include, a programming-free application development wizard, automatic multi-user capabilities, a full-featured 4GL programming language, form, report and label designers, and a fully ANSI SQL compliant relational language capability.

Since September 2007, R:BASE has been available as R:BASE for Windows v7.6, R:BASE for DOS v7.6 and R:BASE Turbo V-8 for Windows. The Version 8.0 has an extended address management for file handling and is able to cover databases up to 2.3 million TB versus V7.6 which covers databases up to 2 GB. A German kernel has existed since R:Base V7.6.

== Legacy R:BASE products ==
=== R:BASE 4000 ===
The earliest version released by Microrim was called R:Base 4000 and was released in 1983. It worked with early version of Microsoft MS-DOS or IBM PC DOS (version 2 or above). It shipped with a binder-type manual and the program on 360KB floppy disks. The system being DOS-based, the interface was entirely text with the exception of DOS line-draw characters.

In spite of its relative ease of use and ability to create useful forms and reports, the first R:Base did not have a conventional programming language, but instead relied on SQL statements to accept input and produce output. The lack of a complete programming language meant that the product was not well received by some portions of the market. This may have helped the early, barely relational, dBASE products to become dominant. The product was quickly upgraded to include Added Variables and a conventional programming Language (IF, WHILE, etc.) to the original SQL-based language The update was released as R:Base 4000 Version 1.1 in March 1984. R:Base became the second most popular DOS database in the PC market (behind dBASE).

Portions of the program allowed the user to design screens, called "Forms" in R:Base. Line-draw characters could implement buttons or boxes that would group text on screen. A separate utility allowed the design of printed output formats and was called "Reports." The report design system allowed a user to define and edit fields included in database reports on screen. Limited printer support was included as DOS programs each had their own unique printer driver for similar printer engines. A markup language allowed italics and bold output if the corresponding printer had a capability. Reports could be piped to the display or a serial port for testing if one were so inclined. Database names were constrained to seven characters. The actual data were contained in three files. In an example database named Sales, files name SALES1.RBF SALES2.RBF, AND SALES3.RBF would contain the database. Forms and reports were stored in files external to the database file.

By default, the application would start with a menu asking which database file you wanted to open. Using a startup switch, R:Base could be run entirely from a command prompt, called the "R-prompt," in system documentation. The application command prompt was an R> although this could be modified to other characters by editing a configuration file. In an example database named Sales, to query the database, you would first open it by typing OPEN SALES at the R-prompt. Using SQL-style queries, one could pull on-screen displays of data from tables. SELECT FNAME LNAME CITY ZIPCODE FROM MAIN would display one screen of data from the fields FNAME LNAME CITY ZIPCODE from the table named MAIN. Pressing the space bar would scroll to the next 24 records. A built-in help system produced text after the R> prompt if your query was invalid or the syntax was not understood by the database engine.

A feature of the program was its ability to create applications that ran scripts generated by an internal scripting system. Scripts were stored in files with an extension .APP. The system would first ask for type of menu desired, (one option was pull-down, for example,) then asked you to fill out the pull down headings. Next, you were stepped through a list of actions for each menu choice. At the end, the procedures that had been stepped through were recorded in the database file and could be called from an automatically generated menu system. To prevent a user from tampering with the generated script, an encoded version was created. The user could password protect the encoded version for configuration management.

A utility called File Gateway allowed import and export of common file formats of the era such as Data Interchange Format (DIF), SYLK, Lotus 1-2-3, and dBASE files. Another utility, called Recover, was intended to recover damaged R:Base databases.

=== R:BASE 5000, R:BASE 2.0 ===
R:Base 4000 was followed by R:Base 5000, which substantially improved features and gained wider acceptance.

R:BASE 2.0 rolled out a new file format and introduced the ability to use memory above 640K. There was support for the Intel 80286 processor. The system had substantially better documentation. This version continued the evolution toward full ANSI SQL compliance. Forms, scripts, and reports were rolled into the database files. Three files with extensions .RB1, .RB2, and .RB3 contained everything for a single database.

=== R:BASE 3.x ===
R:Base 3 manual cover

R:Base 3.0 was ANSI SQL (1989) compliant and utilized the DOS4GW memory manager. This memory manager was also seen in many DOS games of the era. R:Base 3.1 introduced a multi-user network capability. A version was also rolled out for the Convergent Technologies Operating System operating system, this was apparently a follow-on to Burroughs Technologies Operating System (BTOS).

By purchasing license packs, the database gained a multi-user capability in five-user increments. This included a sophisticated (for a DOS application in the day) record-level locking scheme. To work properly, the multi-user database had to be on a file server with all users accessing the database through a network. It was not true client-server because processing occurred in the clients. The configuration file expanded to allow language support and user-defined re-mapping of characters. For example, German characters such as the letter "ö" (o with an umlaut) could be remapped to the string oe. There were character fold tables and sort orders could be adjusted by the user. An "unlimited number of licenses" runtime version was offered, allowing developers to sell applications and include the run-time R:Base engine.

Example of an R:Base 3.1 command prompt transaction asking the application to list the structure of a database table of California cities, (CALIFCY):

 R> LIST CALIFCY
   # Name               Type      Index Expression
   1 STATE              TEXT    2
   2 FEATURE            TEXT   85
   3 FEATURET           TEXT    9
   4 COUNTY1            TEXT   15
   5 FIPSST             TEXT    2
   6 FIPSCO             TEXT    3
   7 LATITUDE           TEXT    7
   8 LONGITUD           TEXT    8
   9 LAT_DEC            TEXT    8
  10 LON_DEC            TEXT   10
  11 SOURCELA           TEXT    7
  12 SOURCELO           TEXT    8
  13 SOUR_lat           TEXT    8
  14 SOUR_lon           TEXT   10
  15 ELEVATIO           TEXT    5
  16 FIELD16            TEXT    8
  17 MAPNAME            TEXT   27
  18 LAT1               DOUBLE
  19 LON                DOUBLE
  20 ITEM_NO            DOUBLE

   Current number of rows:   7070

=== R:BASE 4.x ===
R:Base 4 manual cover

R:Base 4.0 rolled out Intel 80386 support and a newer DOS4GW memory manager. It included a newer file format, replacing the format used with Version 3.1. To support legacy customers, Version 4.0 included a copy of Version 3.1 with a lot of warnings about new file format and features of 4 that were not supported in 3.1. While the documentation claimed 2GB data files were supported, there were data integrity problems with some very large tables over 1 million records. The software was designed to accommodate up to 750 tables and easily handled tables with tens of thousands of records. It was faster than 3.1 and a reliable and practical application for many users.

R:Base for CTOS disk label

R:Base 4.5 rolled out another new file format and greatly improved capacity. OBDC drivers were rolled out to allow interchange of data with Microsoft Windows-based applications without running the DOS-based File Gateway utility. While number of records in a database was "limited only by disk space," in practice, some users found there were problems with databases which contained over about 1.1 million records.

=== First R:BASE for Windows ===
The first product produced by Microrim for use in Microsoft Windows was named R:Base for Windows. This rolled out in 1994. This version was compatible with R:Base 4.5 files and was fully ANSI SQL Level II 1989 compliant. The application was partially ANSI SQL 1992 Level II compliant. The screen capture images in documentation look like Windows 3.1, but documentation claimed it would also run on Windows 95 or the more trustworthy Windows inside OS/2 Warp version 3. A variety of run-time licensing schemes were available to developers.

== Current generation R:BASE products ==
- R:BASE 7.6 for Windows
- R:BASE 7.6 for DOS
- R:BASE Turbo V-8 for Windows
- R:BASE 9.1 for DOS
- R:BASE eXtreme 9.1 (32) for Windows
- R:BASE eXtreme 9.1 (64) for Windows
- R:BASE eXtreme 9.5 (32) for Windows
- R:BASE eXtreme 9.5 (64) for Windows
- R:BASE X (32)
- R:BASE X Enterprise (64)
- R:BASE X.5 (32)
- R:BASE X.5 Enterprise (64)
- R:BASE 11
