= Apache Superset =

Open-source data visualisation software

Superset
- Original author: Maxime Beauchemin / Airbnb
- Stable release: 6.1.0 / 13 May 2026; 2 days ago
- Written in: Python, TypeScript
- Operating system: Cross-platform
- Type: data visualization, business intelligence
- License: Apache License 2.0
- Website: superset.apache.org
- Repository: Superset Repository on Github

Apache Superset is an open-source software application for data exploration and data visualization able to handle data at petabyte scale (big data). The application started as a hack-a-thon project by Maxime Beauchemin (creator of Apache Airflow) while working at Airbnb and entered the Apache Incubator program in 2017. In addition to Airbnb, the project has seen significant contributions from other leading technology companies, including Lyft and Dropbox. Superset graduated from the incubator program and became a top-level project at the Apache Software Foundation in 2021.

== Features ==
- Dashboard creation
- Enterprise authentication (OpenID, LDAP, OAuth, ...)
- Integration with Apache ECharts
- Lightweight semantic layer
- Visualization plugin support
- Compatible with most SQL-speaking datasources

== Managed providers ==
Maxime Beauchemin's company, Preset, offers Superset as a managed service (SaaS).

== See also ==
- Apache Airflow
