= Egghead Software =

Former American technology company

Egghead, Inc.
- Industry: Retail
- Founded: 1984; 42 years ago
- Founder: Victor D. Alhadeff
- Defunct: December 2001; 24 years ago
- Fate: Bankruptcy; Domain name acquired by Amazon.com
- Headquarters: Spokane, Washington, U.S.
- Products: Computer software

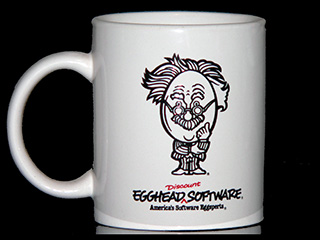
Employee coffee cup, c. 1988

Egghead Software was an American computer software retailer. Founded in 1984, it filed for bankruptcy in 2001 and its domain name was acquired by Amazon.com.

== History ==
The company was founded by Victor D. Alhadeff in 1984, as a single store in Bellevue, Washington.

Customers were able to sign up for a "CUE" card ("Customer Updates and 'Eggs' tras") that would provide discounts.

By June 1987, when Alhadeff was 40 years old, the company had 50 stores on the West Coast of the United States.

In June 1988, the company became a public company via an initial public offering. Within a year, the stock price dropped from $17 per share to $11 per share and top executives, including the founder, were sued for fraud for failing to disclose material facts about the true condition of the company's inventory systems and finances.

By December 1989, the company had 206 stores, but closed 20 of them due to losses and inventory issues and theft.

In June 1993, the company released its first software product, Egghead Express, which allowed customers to place and manage orders.

In 1995, the company moved its headquarters from Issaquah, Washington, east of Seattle, to Spokane. At that time, it had 2,500 employees and operated retail stores in 30 states.

Also in 1995, when the development manager of Windows 95 wanted to test compatibility, he bought a copy of every program for sale at an Egghead store.

In 1996, George Orban became chairman and in January 1997, he became CEO. In May 1996, Egghead sold its Corporate, Government & Education division to Software Spectrum for $45 million. At that time, the stock price was $6 per share and there was speculation of a takeover of the company.

In February 1997, the company announced it would close 77 of its 156 stores and reported additional losses. In May 1997, the company acquired competitor Surplus Software Inc. for $31.5 million.

In January 1998, the company reported a loss and announced it would close all 80 of its remaining stores, lay off 600 of its 800 employees, and sell only through its website, Egghead.com. Its stock price fell 18% on the news.

In July 1998, during the dot-com bubble, shares soared 175% in a couple weeks.

In 1999, the company merged with OnSale.com in a $375 million all-stock transaction. The company kept the Egghead.com name and the CEO of Onsale, Jerry Kaplan, became CEO of the combined company.

In December 2000, right before Christmas, the company's servers were compromised, and it feared that the credit card data of over 3.7 million people was stolen. The company first publicly denied that there was a problem, then notified Visa Inc., which notified banks, who notified consumers, causing the breach to escalate into a full-blown scandal. Many credit cards were cancelled. The company later discovered that credit card information was not obtained.

In August 2001, the company filed bankruptcy and worked out a deal to be acquired by Fry's Electronics. However, the deal fell apart after Fry's accused Egghead of failing to provide financial documents, and in December 2001, the company sold its domain name to Amazon.com.
