= Ron Erickson (investor) =

- Born: Ronald P. Erickson; December 24, 1943 (age 82); Tacoma, Washington
- Education: Central Washington University; University of California at Davis
- Occupations: CEO, angel investor
- Years active: 1970s-present
- Organization(s): Know Labs, Inc.
- Spouse: Dia Armenta
- Children: 2

Ron Erickson (born December 24, 1943) is an American business executive, lawyer, and angel investor based in Seattle. He is the Chairman and CEO of Know Labs, Inc. a public company (NYSE American “KNW” he founded. Know Labs is transforming non-invasive medical diagnostics, focusing first on developing the world's first FDA-cleared non-invasive blood glucose monitor.

His business career began with the co-founding of Microrim in 1981. He has either founded or served as an executive for companies such as GlobalTel Resources, Inc., Egghead Software, Inc., eCharge Corporation and Blue Frog Media. He was the sole investor in Double Down Interactive, a social video game studio that was sold IGT for $500 million in 2012.

== Early life, education ==
Erickson was born on December 24, 1943, in Tacoma, Washington, and raised in Ellensburg, Washington. His father, Ed Erickson, worked in education as both an administrator and professor, first as superintendent of the Ellensburg School District (1952–1958), then as director of planning and development at Central Washington University, a professor and chairman for the department of education, and founding president of the Seattle Community College system.

Ron Erickson spent much of his childhood on the pioneer farm owned by his mother, Ayleen Frederick's family, which they had homesteaded in the Kittitas Valley of Washington in 1876. He graduated from Ellensburg High School. Erickson graduated with a Bachelor of Arts in history from Central Washington University, where he recently served as Chairman of their Board of Trustees. He received a Master of Arts in American Studies at the University of Wyoming.

Early in his career, Erickson worked in public policy at the White House and the Office of Economic Opportunity in Washington, D.C., becoming the latter's branch chief for emergency food and medical services. He also worked for the Rockefeller Commission on Critical Choices in New York City.

He studied law at the University of California at Davis, graduating with a Juris Doctor, and is licensed to practice law in the state of Washington. He was a member of Seattle law firms Kargianis, Austin & Erickson, and Ronald P. Erickson & Associates.

== Business career ==
In the late 1970s, Erickson began his long-term career as a business executive and investor, working primarily with companies in the high technology, telecommunications, micro-computer, and digital media industries. The companies have been both public and private, starting with Microrim, a database software company famous for its R-Base relational database which he co-founded in 1981. He was an initial investor in Egghead Software, where he served variously as chairman, vice-chairman, and interim CEO.

=== Know Labs, Inc. ===
Erickson is the founder of Know Labs, Inc., where he currently serves as Chairman and Chief Executive Officer. Know Labs is a public company whose shares trade on the NYSE American Exchange under the stock symbol “KNW.” The company’s technology uses proprietary radiofrequency spectroscopy to direct electromagnetic energy through a substance or material to capture a unique molecular signature. The technology can be integrated into a variety of wearable, mobile, or bench-top form factors. This patented and patent-pending technology makes it possible to effectively identify and monitor analytes that could only previously be performed by invasive and/or expensive and time-consuming lab-based tests. The first application of the technology will be in a product marketed as a non-invasive glucose monitor. It will provide the user with real-time information on blood glucose levels. This product will require U.S. Food and Drug Administration clearance prior to its introduction to the market. https://www.knowlabs.co/

=== Microrim ===
Logo of Microrim

Among Erickson's first projects was Microrim, Inc., a company he co-founded with his brother Wayne Erickson in 1981 to develop R:Base, the first relational database for the PC.

=== Egghead ===
Erickson was an original investor in Egghead Software, Inc., which was founded by Victor Alhadeff in 1984 as a computer software retail company. Erickson served variously as chairman, interim president and CEO, and director, before leaving the company in 1994.

=== Blue Frog ===
Blue Frog Media was a Seattle mobile media and entertainment company co-founded by Erickson. Originally called Blue Frog Mobile, it sold ringtones, wallpaper images, and games to cellphone users. In 2006, Blue Frog became best known for founding NOYZ, a television network that aired mostly pop and hip hop music videos, where members could send text messages to be placed on the air. Erickson was chairman and CEO of the company until 2007.

=== Double Down Interactive ===
After Blue Frog Mobile dissolved, Blue Frog co-founder Cooper DuBois contacted Erickson to be the sole investor for PickJam, a startup which ran online trivia games. The profits from that company were turned into Double Down Interactive, a social video game studio. Double Down Interactive had its first blackjack game on Facebook in spring of 2010, and turned a profit immediately. In early 2012, Double Down Interactive was acquired by slot-machine company International Game Technology for up to $500 million. The transaction was following the U.S. Justice Department’s decision to drop its legal objections to online gambling.

== Board memberships and affiliations ==
Freei Networks, Freei.

== Personal life ==
As of 2023, Erickson lives on Bainbridge Island in Washington with his wife Dia Armenta, a political and governmental affairs consultant. Erickson has competed in the Ironman Triathlon and Half Ironman, and was thrice ranked as the number one triathlete in his age group in the Northwest. He is an active participant in vintage sports car racing, driving a 1957 Corvette and a 1969 Porsche 911.

== See also ==
- Angel investing
