= NOYZ =

American television network

- Type: Television network
- Branding: "NOYZ"
- Country: United States
- Availability: United States
- Owner: Blue Frog Media
- Launch date: January 2006; 19 years ago
- Dissolved: January 10, 2008; 17 years ago
- Affiliates: Several over-the-air television stations

NOYZ was an American television network owned and operated by Seattle-based Blue Frog Media. Blue Frog also established BULLA, a Hispanic music channel similar to NOYZ. BULLA was discontinued in December 2007 due to budget and staffing cuts.

== History ==
=== Founding by Blue Frog Media ===
NOYZ was an American television network owned and operated by Seattle-based Blue Frog Media.

Blue Frog Media was a Seattle mobile media and entertainment company co-founded by Ron Erickson. Originally called Blue Frog Mobile, it sold ringtones, wallpaper images, and games to cell-phone users. Erickson was chairman and CEO of the company until 2007.

In addition to NOYZ, Blue Frog also established BULLA, a Hispanic music channel similar to NOYZ. BULLA was discontinued in December 2007 due to budget and staffing cuts.

=== Start of NOYZ ===
In 2006 Blue Frog became best known for founding NOYZ, a television network that aired mostly pop and hip hop music videos, where members could send text messages to be placed on the air. The videos featured a continuing interactive chat on the bottom third of the screen, where members could talk using text messages transmitted to the network to be placed on air. Each message cost 99¢, and had to be broadcast-safe to be featured on-air.

=== Discontinuation ===
The network aired beginning in 2007 overnights on the men's digital cable network MAVTV, but as of January 10, 2008 that network discontinued airing it, suggesting NOYZ went off-the-air. Shortly after, the network's website was taken offline and would lead to a domain parking page. Blue Frog Media had burned through $16 million of venture capital funding over three years and was unable to raise any more money, and filed for Chapter 7 bankruptcy on February 1, 2008, with $1 million in liabilities from service providers, television stations and other creditors. Blue Frog had planned further expansion before their bankruptcy in 2008, using the funds from the shutdown of BULLA to establish Noyz Country (a country-oriented channel), and UR Noyz, which would focus on Christian music.

== See also ==
- The Box - former over-the-air music network similar to NOYZ, later evolved into MTV2
- MTV2 - available in some areas over-the-air
- Mas Musica - former over-the-air music network, evolved into MTV Tr3s
- MTV Tr3s - available in some areas over the air
