= OLE DB for OLAP =

OLE DB for OLAP (Object Linking and Embedding Database for Online Analytical Processing abbreviated ODBO) is a Microsoft published specification and an industry standard for multi-dimensional data processing. ODBO is the standard application programming interface (API) for exchanging metadata and data between an OLAP server and a client on a Windows platform. ODBO extends the ability of OLE DB to access multi-dimensional (OLAP) data stores.

== Description ==
ODBO is the most widely supported, multi-dimensional API to date. Platform-specific to Microsoft Windows, ODBO was specifically designed for Online Analytical Processing (OLAP) systems by Microsoft as an extension to Object Linking and Embedding Database (OLE DB). ODBO uses Microsoft's Component Object Model.

ODBO permits independent software vendors (ISVs) and corporate developers to create a single set of standard interfaces that allow OLAP clients to access multi-dimensional data, regardless of vendor or data source. ODBO is currently supported by a wide spectrum of server and client tools.

When exposing the ODBO interface, the underlying multi-dimensional database must also support the MDX Query Language. XML for Analysis is a newer interface to MDX Data Sources that is often supported in parallel with ODBO.

== See also ==
- XML for Analysis
