= SQL Server Integration Services =

Database migration software

- Developer: Microsoft
- Operating system: Microsoft Windows
- Type: ETL Tools
- License: Proprietary commercial software
- Website: technet.microsoft.com/en-us/library/ms141026.aspx

Microsoft SQL Server Integration Services (SSIS) is a component of the Microsoft SQL Server database software that can be used to perform a broad range of data migration tasks.

SSIS is a platform for data integration and workflow applications. It features a data warehousing tool used for data extraction, transformation, and loading (ETL). The tool may also be used to automate maintenance of SQL Server databases and updates to multidimensional cube data.

First released with Microsoft SQL Server 2005, SSIS replaced Data Transformation Services, which had been a feature of SQL Server since Version 7.0. Unlike DTS, which was included in all versions, SSIS is only available in the "Standard", "Business Intelligence" and "Enterprise" editions. With Microsoft "Visual Studio Dev Essentials" it is now possible to use SSIS with Visual Studio 2017 free of cost so long as it is for development and learning purposes only.

== Features ==
The SSIS Import/Export Wizard lets the user create packages that move data from a single data source to a destination with no transformations. The Wizard can quickly move data from a variety of source types to a variety of destination types, including text files and other SQL Server instances.

Developers tasked with creating or maintaining SSIS packages use a visual development tool based on Microsoft Visual Studio called the SQL Server Business Intelligence Development Studio (BIDS). It allows users to edit SSIS packages using a drag-and-drop user interface. A scripting environment for writing programming code is also available in the tool. A package holds a variety of elements that define a workflow. Upon package execution, the tool provides color-coded real-time monitoring. (Note: In more recent versions MS SQL Server, BIDS has been replaced with "SQL Server Data Tools - Business Intelligence" (SSDT-BI).)

Connections
A connection includes the information necessary to connect to a particular data source. Tasks can reference the connection by its name, allowing the details of the connection to be changed or configured at run time.
Event handlers
A workflow can be designed for a number of events in the different scopes where they might occur. In this way, tasks may be executed in response to happenings within the package — such as cleaning up after errors.
Parameters (SQL Server 2012 Integration Services)
Parameters allow you to assign values to properties within packages at the time of package execution. You can have project parameters and package parameters. In general, if you are deploying a package using the package deployment model, you should use configurations instead of parameters.
Precedence constraints
Tasks are linked by precedence constraints. The precedence constraint preceding a particular task must be met before that task executes. The run time supports executing tasks in parallel, if their precedence constraints so allow. Constraints may otherwise allow different paths of execution depending on the success or failure of other tasks. Together with the tasks, precedence constraints comprise the workflow of the package.
Tasks
A task is an atomic work unit that performs some action. There are a couple of dozen tasks that are included with SQL Server, ranging from the file system task (that can copy or move files) to the data transformation task. The data transformation task actually copies data; it implements the ETL features of the product
Variables
Tasks may reference variables to store results, make decisions, or affect their configuration.
Streamlined Data Integration
SSIS offers a visual interface and pre-built components to simplify the process of extracting data from various sources, transforming it, and loading it into target destinations. This reduces development time and effort compared to writing custom code.

A package may be saved to a file or to a store with a hierarchical namespace within a SQL Server instance. In either case, the package content is persisted in XML.

Once completed, the designer also allows the user to start the package's execution. Once started, the package may be readily debugged or monitored.

=== Features of the data flow task ===
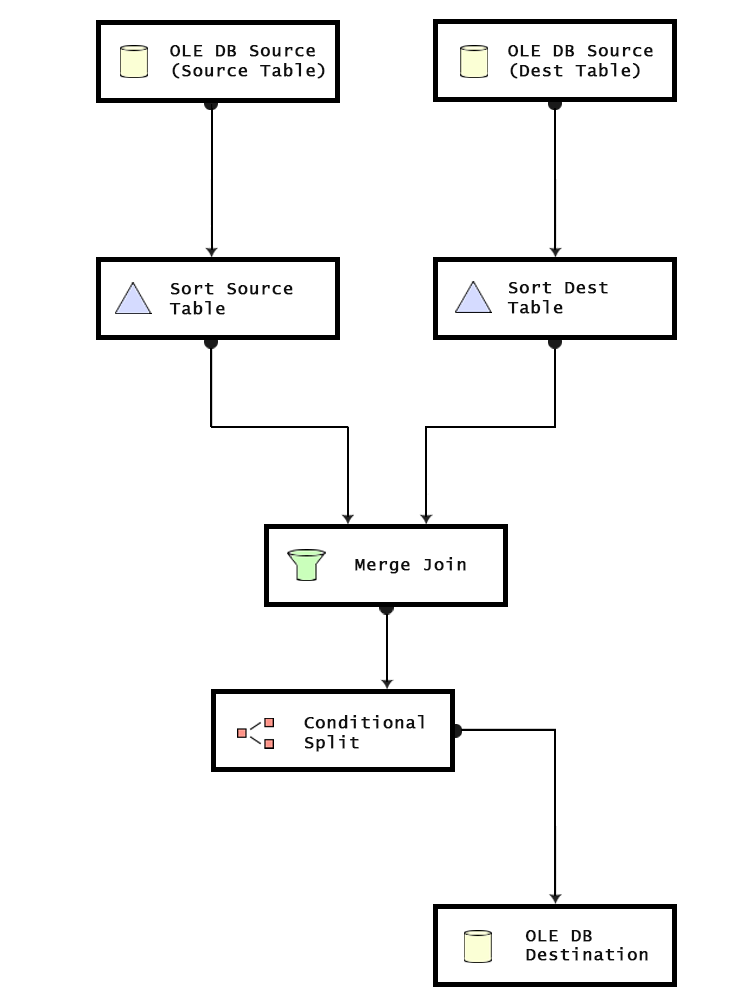
An example of a SQL Server Integration Services (SSIS) workflow, by visually programming the steps needed to transform data from source to destination.

SSIS provides the following built-in transformations:

- Aggregation
- Audit
- Cache transform
- Copy/Map
- Data conversion
- Data mining model training
- Data mining query
- Dimension processing
- Derived column
- Export and import column
- For loop container
- Foreach loop container
- (Fuzzy) lookup
- Fuzzy grouping
- OLE DB command
- Partition processing
- Percentage sampling
- Pivot
- Unpivot
- Row count
- Row sampling
- Row sampling transformation
- Script component
- Slowly changing dimension
- Term extraction
- Term Lookup

The conditional split transformation is used to conditionally route rows to other transformation objects based on a particular condition. It is similar to the "if … else" construct in the C language.

== Other included tools ==
Aside from the Import/Export Wizard and the designer, the product includes a few other notable tools.

DTEXEC executes a package from the command line wherever it may be stored. Before running the package, the tool may be instructed to apply configuration information, which will allow the same package to be reused with slightly different parameters, including different connection strings for its endpoints.

DTUTIL provides the ability to manage packages from the command prompt. The tool can copy or move a package from a file into the server store, or back out again. Among a few other sundry functions, it can be used to delete, rename, encrypt, or decrypt packages.

The Bulk Copy Program (BCP), is a command-line tool used to import or export data against a Microsoft SQL Server, or Sybase database.

== Extensibility and programmability ==
Users may write code to define their own connection objects, log providers, transforms, and tasks.

SSIS features a programmable object model that allows developers to write their own hosts for package execution. Such a host can respond to events, start and stop packages, and so on. The object model also allows developers to create, store, and load packages, as well as create, destroy, and modify any of the contained objects.

Within limits, SSIS packages can load and call CLI assembly DLLs, providing access to virtually any kind of operation permissible by the .NET CLR.

SSIS can be used on all SQL Server 2005, 2008, 2008 R2, 2012, 2014 and 2016 editions except Express and Workgroup.

== See also ==
- Data Transformation Services
