= Semantic layer =

Business representation of data

A semantic layer is a business representation of corporate data that helps end users access data autonomously using common business terms managed through business semantics management. A semantic layer maps complex data into familiar business terms such as product, customer, or revenue to offer a unified, consolidated view of data across the organization.

The term is also used in a related, but distinct sense to describe the architecture and framework used to describe an organization's knowledge assets, including unstructured and structured data in a consistent, machine and human readable representation. These semantic layers are built using semantic standards such as RDF, SKOS, and OWL. This usage has grown alongside interest in knowledge graphs and retrieval-augmented generation (RAG) as infrastructure for enterprise artificial intelligence.

== History ==
After its initial filing in 1991, Business Objects obtained U.S. Patent 5,555,403 in September 1996, which "provides a new data representation and a query technique which allows information system end users to access (query) relational databases without knowing the relational structure or the structured query language (SQL)".[1] Over time, some competitors like Cognos paid licensing fees.[2] However, in 2003, Microstrategy successfully defended a brought suit by Business Objects alleging patent infringement.[3]

Independently of the commercial and legal history associated with the 'Business Objects Semantic Layer', the term itself draws on a longer intellectual lineage of "semantics" in computer science. The word ‘semantics’ originated with the French philologist Michel Bréal in 1883, describing the study of meaning in language. In 1967, Robert W. Floyd's work on programming language theory distinguished the semantics (meaning) of a program from its syntax (form), a distinction credited with founding the field of programming language semantics. This thread of research fed into the development of Semantic Web standards by the World Wide Web Consortium (W3C) in the late 1990s and early 2000s, including RDF, OWL, and SKOS, which provide formal means of representing concepts, relationships, and controlled vocabularies as linked data.

== Standalone semantic layers ==
Semantic layer functionality was historically embedded within individual Business Intelligence platforms. In the late 2010s and early 2020s, a category of independent products emerged — variously described as a "universal semantic layer", "metrics layer", or "headless BI" — that defines business metrics and data models in a central repository outside of any single analytics tool and exposes them through application programming interfaces to multiple consumers, including business intelligence applications, spreadsheets, embedded analytics, and Artificial Intelligence assistants.

Products in this category include AtScale, Cube, and the dbt. Business intelligence vendors such as Looker offer comparable semantic modeling capabilities within their own platforms. Interest in standalone semantic layers has grown alongside the adoption of generative AI tools for data analysis, which draw on centrally defined metrics to produce consistent results when querying enterprise data.

== BI Semantic Layer ==
The semantic layer enables business users to have a common "look and feel" when accessing and analyzing data stored in relational databases and OLAP cubes. By using common business terms, rather than data language, to access, manipulate, and organize information, a semantic layer simplifies the complexity of business data. Business terms are stored as objects in a semantic layer, which are accessed through business views.

Business Views is a multi-tier system that is designed to enable companies to build comprehensive and specific business objects that help report designers and end users access the information they require. Business Views is intended to enable people to add the necessary business context to their data islands and link them into a single organized Business View for their organization.

== Knowledge/Meaning Semantic Layer ==
In addition to its use in business intelligence, "semantic layer" describes an architecture rooted in knowledge management and Linked Data standards. Rather than focusing primarily on standardizing business metrics for reporting, this approach defines conceptual entities and the relationships between them, with the goal of supporting interoperability across domains and data formats. This sense of the term builds on World Wide Web Consortium (W3C) standards developed for the Semantic Web, including the Resource Description Framework (RDF) and the Web Ontology Language (OWL). RDF represents information as statements linking a subject, a predicate, and an object, and is designed to let data from different sources be combined and merged even when the underlying schemas were created independently. OWL extends this foundation with a more expressive, logic-based vocabulary for defining classes, properties, and the relationships between them; because OWL is a computational logic-based language, knowledge expressed in it can be reasoned over by computer programs to verify consistency or make implicit knowledge explicit. Related standards such as the Simple Knowledge Organization System (SKOS) build on this same RDF foundation to represent thesauri, taxonomies, and other controlled vocabularies as linked data.

These semantic standards provide the foundation to create and use the core components of a semantic layer. Taxonomies and business glossaries establish shared terminology, metadata describes knowledge assets; an ontology model and knowledge graph represent relationships between assets and concepts. Semantic layers support organizational use cases that serve to align, standardize, and merge disparate information resources such as findability, disambiguation, metadata enhancement, 360 views, intent analysis, analytics, and a variety of AI driven use cases.

=== Relationship to artificial intelligence ===
Since the wider adoption of large language models in the mid-2020s, this form of semantic layer has increasingly been discussed as infrastructure supporting enterprise AI applications, including retrieval-augmented generation (RAG). Research briefings from MIT's Center for Information Systems Research have argued that organizations face increasing pressure to invest in semantic technologies capable of making data assets usable by both business users and AI models or AI agents.

=== Apache Ossie ===
Apache OSSIE (incubating), formerly the Open Semantic Interchange (OSI), is an open-source, vendor-neutral specification for exchanging semantic layer definitions between analytics, business intelligence (BI) and artificial intelligence (AI) tools. The initiative was announced in September 2025 by Snowflake together with partners including Salesforce, Data_build_tool and RelationalAI, and was framed as a response to inconsistent metric definitions across tools.

The specification uses a YAML format to describe datasets, relationships, fields (dimensions) and metrics, along with business context, so that a definition such as "monthly active users" can be resolved consistently across data warehouses, BI tools and AI agents. The project is licensed under the Apache License 2.0, and the initiative has said it plans to supply converters for existing semantic layer products.

In July 2026 the project entered the Apache Incubator under the name Apache OSSIE. Several vendors have announced or begun work on support for importing or exporting the format, including Data_build_tool's MetricFlow and Lightdash.

== See also ==
- Semantic Web
- Simple Knowledge Organization System
- Semantic Web Stack
- Semantic data model
- Linked Open Data
- OSSIE
