= BigQuery =

Cloud-based data warehouse service

- Website type: Platform as a service data warehouse
- Available in: English
- Owner: Google
- Website: cloud.google.com/bigquery
- Registration: Required
- Launched: May 19, 2010; 16 years ago
- Current status: Active

BigQuery is a managed, serverless data warehouse product by Google, offering scalable analysis over large quantities of data. It is a Platform as a Service (PaaS) that supports querying using a dialect of SQL and Graph Query Language. It also has built-in machine learning capabilities. BigQuery was announced in May 2010 and made generally available in November 2011.

== History ==
BigQuery originated from Google's internal Dremel technology, which enabled quick queries across trillions of rows of data. The product was originally announced in May 2010 at Google I/O. Initially, it was only usable by a limited number of external early adopters due to limitations on the API. However, after the product proved its potential, it was released for limited availability in 2011 and general availability in 2012. After general availability, BigQuery found success among a broad range of customers, including airlines, insurance, and retail organizations.

== Design ==
BigQuery requires all requests to be authenticated, supporting a number of Google-proprietary mechanisms as well as OAuth.

== Features ==
- Managing data - Create and delete objects such as tables, views, and user defined functions. Import data from Google Storage in formats such as CSV, Parquet, Avro or JSON.
- Query - Queries are expressed in a SQL dialect and the results are returned in JSON with a maximum reply length of approximately 128 MB, or an unlimited size when large query results are enabled.
- Integration - BigQuery can be used from Google Apps Script (e.g. as a bound script in Google Docs), or any language that can work with its REST API or client libraries.
- Access control - Share datasets with arbitrary individuals, groups, or the world.
- Machine learning - Create and execute machine learning models using SQL queries.
