= OSSIE =

Open specification for exchanging business semantic metadata

Apache Ossie (incubating)
- Developers: Apache Software Foundation and community contributors
- Release: September 23, 2025; 13 months ago (as Open Semantic Interchange)
- Type: Metadata specification, semantic layer interchange format
- License: Apache License 2.0
- Website: ossie.apache.org

Apache Ossie (incubating) is an open, vendor-neutral specification for expressing business metrics, dimensions, and the relationships between them, so that analytics, business intelligence (BI), and artificial intelligence (AI) tools can exchange semantic definitions without losing meaning. The project began in 2025 as the Open Semantic Interchange (OSI), an industry initiative led by Snowflake, and was accepted into the The Apache Software Foundation Incubator in June 2026 under its current name.

== Background ==
Organizations commonly define the same business concepts, such as "revenue" or "customer lifetime value", separately in each data warehouse, BI tool, and data catalog. These duplicated definitions can drift apart and produce inconsistent figures across systems. The problem gained attention with the spread of AI agents that generate queries against enterprise data, because an agent given only a database schema lacks the business logic needed to compute metrics correctly.

== History ==
=== Open Semantic Interchange ===
On 23 September 2025, Snowflake announced the Open Semantic Interchange as an open-source initiative to create a vendor-neutral standard for defining and sharing semantic metadata. Snowflake_Inc, Salesforce (including Tableau), and Data_build_tool were the leading participants. The initial coalition also included RelationalAI, Mistral AI, Alation, Atlan, Blue Yonder, Cube, and Sigma among others.

The specification was subsequently released under the Apache License 2.0, with working groups formed and additional companies joining the initiative.

=== Move to the Apache Software Foundation ===
According to the Apache Incubator's status page, the project entered incubation on 22 June 2026. Snowflake and the Apache Software Foundation publicly announced the move on 8 July 2026, with the project renamed Apache Ossie. Project materials state that the specification, community, and mission were unchanged by the transition, while the name, governance home, and long-term direction changed. The incubator's record lists JB Onofré as champion, with Holden Karau, Zili Chen, Russell Spitzer, and Onofré as mentors.

Snowflake's announcement said the Foundation's vendor-neutral governance was meant to keep the standard from being controlled by a single company, and that the project would operate through public mailing lists, GitHub-based development, formal discussion and voting on specification changes, and committer status earned by contribution rather than employer affiliation. The project's mascot is a kangaroo.

== Specification ==
Ossie defines a YAML-based format for describing metrics, dimensions, and relationships, intended to be readable and writable by any compliant tool. The aim is to capture not only metric formulas but also broader business context, so that both people and AI agents work from the same definitions.

== Governance and community ==
Under Apache governance, the project's direction is expected to be set by the wider community rather than any single vendor. By mid-2026 the participating coalition had grown from 17 launch partners to more than 50 organizations. Three working groups, covering the metric language, catalogs, and ontologies, operate with designated leads and public channels. As an incubating project, Ossie is working toward the governance, infrastructure, and community practices expected of established Apache projects.

== Implementations and ecosystem ==
Reference converters have been developed for several platforms, including:

- Data_build_tool MetricFlow
- Snowflake semantic models

Microsoft has publicly affirmed its commitment to the project and maintains a converter in the project repository. Trade coverage has described Microsoft and Google as backers. Other vendors, including Kyvos and Ataccama, have announced participation or open-source converters.

== Limitations ==
Apache Ossie is a specification for exchanging semantic models, not a query engine; nothing executes an Ossie file, and each consuming tool builds its own objects from it. Metrics are defined as aggregate SQL expressions written against datasets, with one or more SQL dialects per expression.

=== Level of Detail (LoD) calculations ===
Ossie has no dedicated construct for Level of Detail (LoD) calculations, which compute an aggregate at a granularity independent of the grouping of the query that uses them (a feature popularised by Tableau). While Snowflake supports for Level of Details in Snowflake Semantic Views, it has not been incorporated into OSSIE specs as of yet.

== Planned work ==
Stated priorities include extending the specification to cover advanced metric logic, window functions, and complex relationships; adding converters for more platforms; defining a standardized semantic query specification; and integrating with Apache Polaris so that semantic models can be discovered directly from catalogs.

== See also ==
- Semantic layer
- Apache Iceberg
- Data_build_tool
- Metadata standard
