= Stanley Zdonik =

American computer scientist (1947–2026)

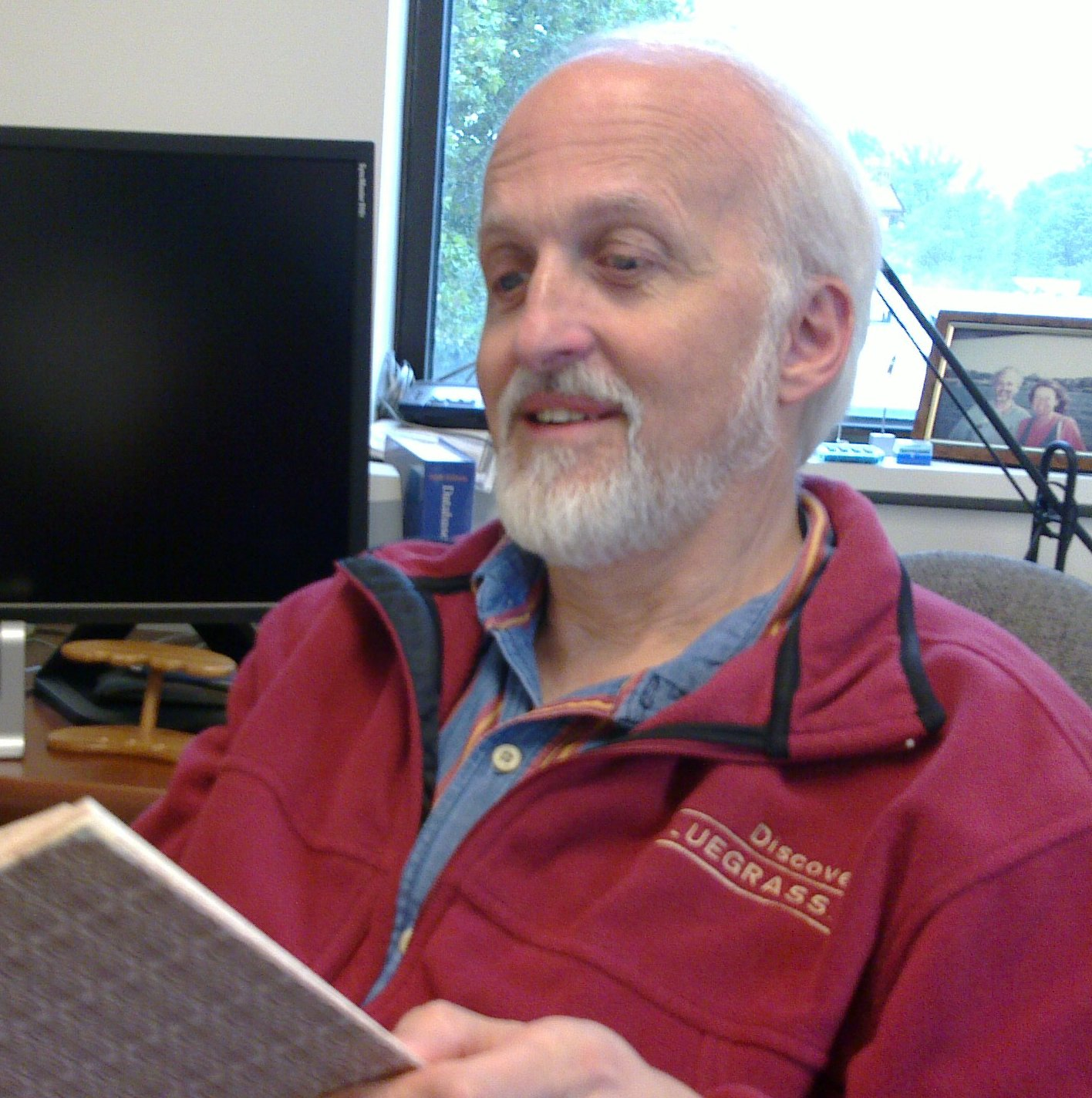
- Born: June 25, 1947; Boston, Massachusetts, U.S.
- Died: February 5, 2026 (aged 78)
- Education: Massachusetts Institute of Technology
- Known for: Encore-Ob/Server, C-Store, Aurora/Borealis, H-Store
- Scientific career
- Fields: Computer Science
- Workplaces: Brown University
- Doctoral advisor: Michael Hammer
- Notable students: Andy Pavlo

Stanley Zdonik (/zəˈdɒnɪk/ zə-DON-ik June 25, 1947 – February 5, 2026) was an American computer scientist specializing in database management systems. He was a tenured professor of computer science at Brown University. Zdonik lived in the Boston area his entire life. After completing two bachelor’s and two master's degrees at MIT, he then earned a PhD in database management under Michael Hammer.

In the mid-1970s, Zdonik worked on the Prophet data management system for pharmacologists at Bolt Beranek and Newman Inc. After becoming a professor at Brown University during the early 1980s, Zdonik became a leading researcher in object-oriented databases. He has over one hundred peer-reviewed papers in the database field and was named an ACM Fellow in 2006. He was involved in the development of several notable database projects with other researchers, including Michael Stonebraker and Sam Madden. These projects include the Aurora and Borealis stream processing engines, the C-Store column store database, and the H-Store parallel, main memory OLTP system. He also served as a member of the VLDB Board of Trustees and has been the general chair for several major database conferences.

Outside of academia, Zdonik was a co-founder for both the StreamBase and Vertica companies, as well as being a technical advisor for Attivio. Episode 2035 of Car Talk (approximately 35m) refers to his stint as an instructor in novice automobile maintenance.

Zdonik died on February 5, 2026, at the age of 78.

== Education ==
Zdonik received a number of non-honorary degrees during his career, all from MIT.

- Ph.D., Computer Science, June 1983. Massachusetts Institute of Technology
- M.S., Computer Science, 1980. Massachusetts Institute of Technology
- M.S., Electrical Engineering, 1980. Massachusetts Institute of Technology
- B.S., Computer Science, 1970. Massachusetts Institute of Technology
- B.S., Electrical Engineering, 1970. Massachusetts Institute of Technology
