= Mike Bostock =

American computer scientist

- Education: Stanford University (PhD)
- Occupation: Software engineer
- Employer: Observable
- Known for: D3.js, TopoJSON, ObservableHQ
- Awards: Gerald Loeb Award; 2013; 2014; 2015

Academic background
- Doctoral advisor: Jeffrey Heer
- Website: bost.ocks.org/mike/

Michael Bostock is an American computer scientist and data visualization specialist. He is one of the co-creators of Observable and a key developer of D3.js, a JavaScript library used to produce dynamic, interactive data visualizations for web browsers. He also contributed to the preceding Protovis framework.

== Biography ==
Bostock pursued a PhD in computer science at Stanford University. In 2009, Bostock was advised by Jeffrey Heer at Stanford. As a part of Stanford's Visualization Group (VisGroup), they created Protovis, a JavaScript-based visualization toolkit. The toolkit relied on native browser technologies and included an abstract representation layer that made it difficult to debug. In 2011, Bostock, Heer, and Vadim Ogievetsky announced D3.js, a successor to Protovis. D3 stood for data-driven documents and allowed data objects to be bound directly to the browser's Document Object Model instead of requiring interaction with an intermediate layer. This change allowed for easier debugging. In 2017, the IEEE Computer Society acknowledged D3 as the "de facto standard for web-based interactive visualization". Bostock later developed TopoJSON, a program that removes redundant coordinates used in drawing shapes on maps using the SVG format. The system used 80% less memory than GeoJSON.

Bostock continued developing the D3 library and provided hundreds of examples online. He became a graphics editor at New York Times and wrote data-rich stories for the paper using D3. For his work at New York Times, he shared the 2013, 2014, and 2015 Gerald Loeb Awards for Images/Visuals. He left his position at the paper in 2015 to focus on other projects.

Bostock co-founded Observable, a web platform for making and sharing data analyses and visualizations, with Google vice president Melody Meckfessel. The company launched in 2020 with a $10.5 million Series A funding round led by the venture capital firms Sequoia Capital and Acrew Capital. After its founding, Bostock served as Observable's chief technology officer.

In 2013, statistician Edward Tufte predicted that Bostock would become one of the most important people for the future of data visualization. In 2015, the New York Times "Innovation Report" called him a "digital superstar". Bostock was also interviewed by the Data Stories podcast and presented at Eyeo 2014. He advised the data platform provider Trifacta, which was later acquired by the technology company Alteryx.

== Published works ==
- Bostock, Michael; Heer, Jeffrey (2009). "Protovis: A Graphical Toolkit for Visualization"
- Bostock, Michael; Ogievetsky, Vadim; Heer, Jeffrey (2011). "D3: Data-Driven Documents"
