= Joseph M. Hellerstein =

American computer scientist

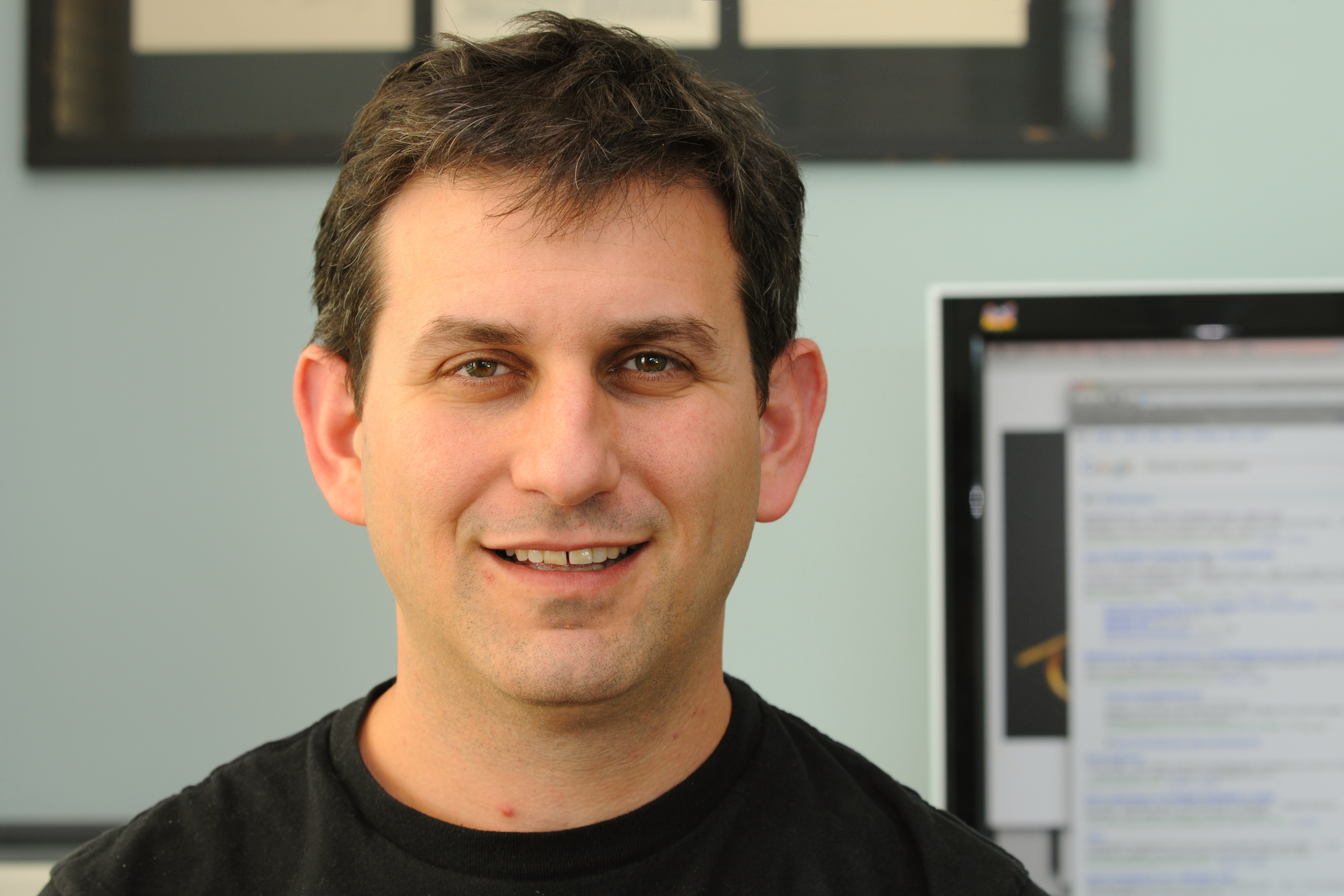
- Born: 7 June 1968 (age 58)
- Education: Harvard University (BA); University of California, Berkeley (MS); University of Wisconsin–Madison (PhD)
- Scientific career
- Fields: Computer science
- Workplaces: University of California, Berkeley
- Doctoral advisor: Jeffrey Naughton; Michael Stonebraker
- Doctoral students: Sam Madden; Boon Thau Loo
- Website: db.cs.berkeley.edu/jmh

Joseph M. Hellerstein (born 7 June 1968) is an American professor of computer science at the University of California, Berkeley, where he works on database systems and computer networks. He co-founded Trifacta with Jeffrey Heer and Sean Kandel in 2012, which stemmed from their research project, Wrangler.

== Education ==
Hellerstein attended Harvard University from 1986 to 1990 (AB computer science) and pursued his master's degree in computer science at University of California, Berkeley from 1991 to 1992. He received his Ph.D., also in computer science, from the University of Wisconsin, Madison in 1995, for a thesis on query optimization supervised by Jeffrey Naughton and Michael Stonebraker.

== Research ==
Hellerstein has made contributions to many areas of database systems, such as ad-hoc sensor networks, adaptive query processing, approximate query processing and online aggregation, declarative networking, and data stream processing.

== Awards and recognition ==
Hellerstein's work has been recognized with an Alfred P. Sloan Fellowship, MIT Technology Review's inaugural TR100 list and TR10 list, Fortune 50 smartest in Tech, and three ACM-SIGMOD "Test of Time" awards. He is a Fellow of the Association for Computing Machinery (2009).
