= Sarah Cohen-Boulakia =

French computer scientist and data scientist

Sarah Cohen-Boulakia (born 1980) is a French computer scientist and data scientist known for her research on data provenance in science, and especially in bioinformatics. She is a professor of bioinformatics in the Laboratory for Computer Science (Laboratoire de recherche en informatique) of the French National Centre for Scientific Research and Paris-Saclay University.

Cohen-Boulakia has a doctorate and habilitation from Paris-Saclay University, and did postdoctoral research at the University of Pennsylvania and the Institute for Computational Biology of Montpellier before returning to Paris-Saclay as a professor.
