= Cafection =

Canadian coffee brewer manufacturer

Cafection Ventures Inc.
- Company type: Private
- Industry: Coffee brewer equipment
- Founded: 1996
- Founder: Yves Baron
- Headquarters: Quebec, Canada
- Area served: North America
- Products: Industrial reverse French press coffeemakers
- Services: Coffee
- Owner: François Baron (CEO)
- Parent: Evoca Group S.p.A. (67%)
- Website: https://www.cafection.com/

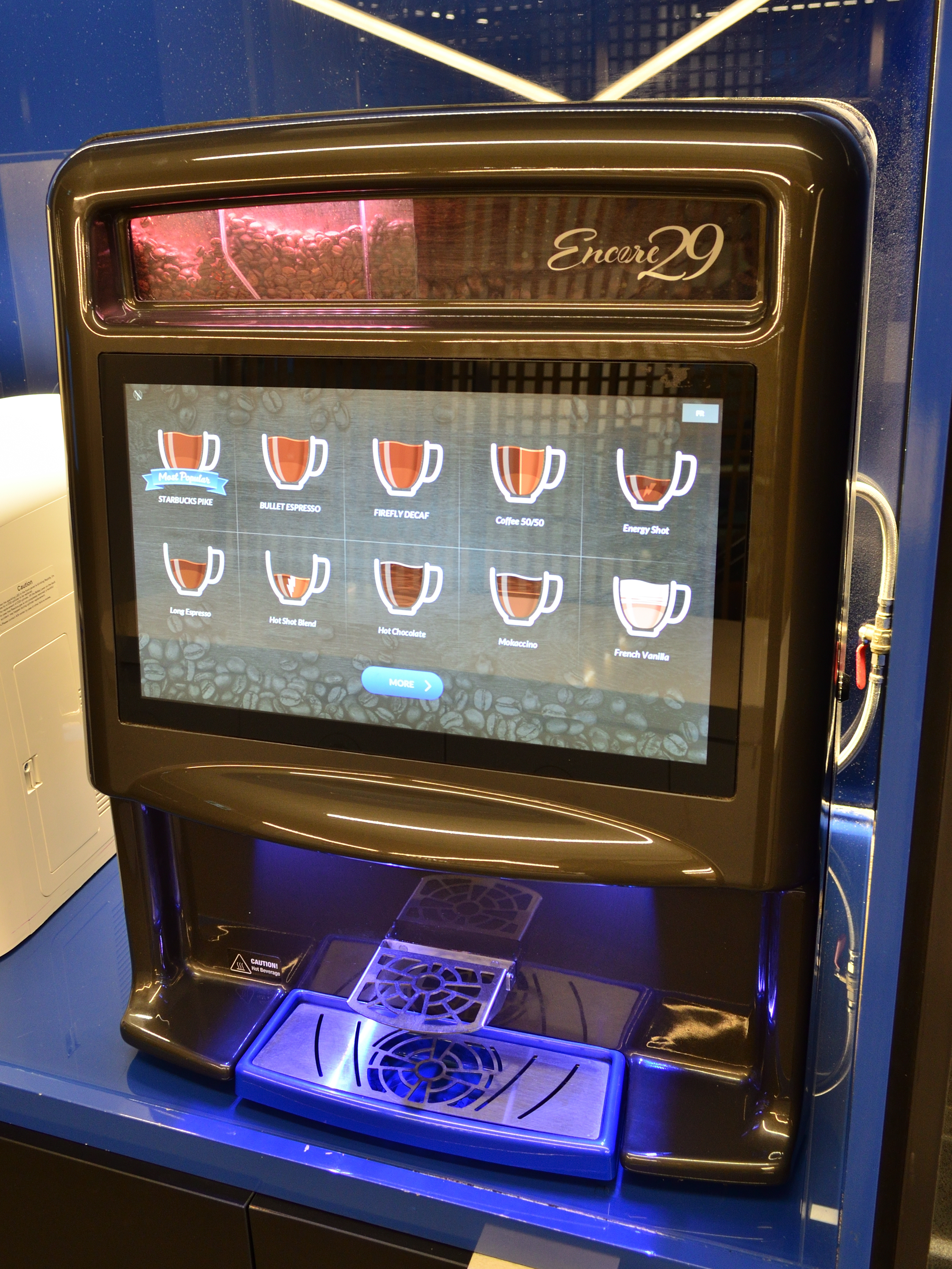
Cafection Encore29 coffee machine

Cafection is a coffee brewer equipment manufacturer based in Canada. It is one of the leading North American professional coffee brewing system manufacturers and OEM suppliers, with more than 3.000 clients and 62.500 coffee machines in Canada and United States. Cafection designs, manufactures and distributes coffee equipment to various industries, including Office Coffee Service, Hospitality, Foodservice and C-Store. The company served over 2 billion cups of coffee in 2012. The coffee brewers made by Cafection produce only biodegradable by-products.

== History ==
After decades of business in the coffee industry, Mrs. and Mr. Yves Baron started manufacturing their own bean-to-cup coffee brewers in 1996. In 2011, they sold the company to their son Frank Baron.

The enterprise said it was possibly the first in the world to launch Internet connected touchscreen coffeemakers in 2012. Cafection has partnerships with Apple, Google, Aramark, Facebook, Microsoft and Bill and Melinda Gates' Foundation.

In February 2013, Cafection was named "Business of the Year" at the Fidéides gala, held by the Chamber of Commerce of Quebec City.
