= AYX =

AYX may refer to:

- Alteryx, a software company in California (NYSE: AYX)
- Arnold Air Force Base, a United States Air Force base in Tennessee
