= Sean Kandel =

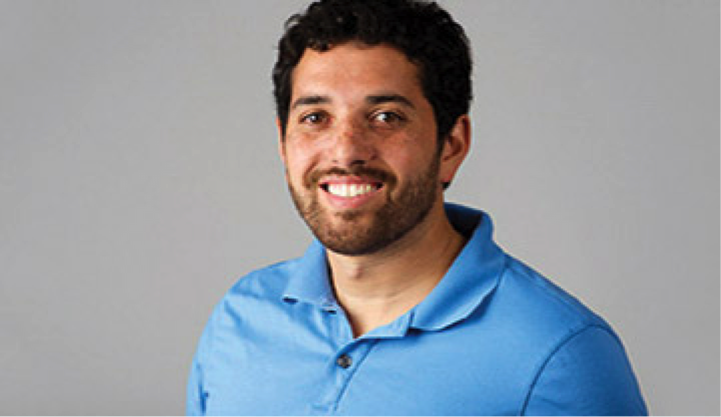
- Occupation: Chief Technical Officer

Sean Kandel is Trifacta's Chief Technical Officer and Co-founder, along with Joseph M. Hellerstein and Jeffrey Heer. He is known for the development of new tools for data transformation and discovery and is the co-developed of Data Wrangler, an interactive tool for data cleaning and transformation.

== Education and Research ==
Kandel graduated from Stanford University in 2013 with a Ph.D. in Computer Science. As a Ph.D. student in the Visualization Group at Stanford, he designed and built interactive tools for data analysis, management, and visualization.

He received a Ph.D. from Stanford University in 2013 for his thesis on Interactive systems for data transformation and assessment under primary advisors Jeffrey Heer. While at Stanford, he published multiple research papers and articles with Trifacta co-founders Jeffrey Heer and Joseph Hellerstein on topics of big data analysis, data quality assessment, and visualization for data transformation, as well as other big data research. Kandel’s major research contribution to date has been as co-developer of Data Wrangler, a research initiative between Stanford and the University of California, Berkeley. The project resulted in the company Trifacta eventually selling Data Wrangler as a commercialized product.

== Awards and recognition ==
In 2017, Kandel was a recipient of an award for Silicon Valley’s young business leaders who are impacting their industries and their communities, Silicon Valley’s 40 Under 40 list. Import.io also included Sean in their list of 40 Data Mavericks under 40 list.

He frequently presents at a variety of big data conferences including Strata World and Hadoop Users Group UK on topics including data lineage, data transformation, machine learning and semi-structured data, big data project success, and other industry subject areas.
