= Daniel Abadi =

American computer scientist and professor

- Education: Brandeis University (BS, 2002); Cambridge University (MPhil, 2003); Massachusetts Institute of Technology (PhD, 2008)
- Occupation: Professor of Computer Science at University of Maryland, College Park
- Awards: Sloan Fellowship (2011); ACM Fellow (2020)
- Scientific career
- Fields: Computer Science
- Workplaces: Yale University; University of Maryland, College Park
- Thesis: Query Execution in Column-Oriented Database Systems (2008)
- Doctoral advisor: Samuel Madden
- Website: www.cs.umd.edu/~abadi/

Daniel Abadi is the Darnell-Kanal Professor of Computer Science at University of Maryland, College Park. His primary area of research is database systems, with contributions to stream databases, distributed databases, graph databases, and column-store databases. He helped create C-Store, a column-oriented database, and HadoopDB, a hybrid of relational databases and Hadoop. Both database systems were commercialized by companies.

Abadi was the first to describe the PACELC theorem in a 2010 blog post. PACELC, a response to the CAP theorem, was proved formally in 2018 in a SIGACT News article.

== Education and career ==
Abadi obtained a Bachelor of Science degree in Computer Science and Neuroscience from Brandeis University in 2002. A year later, he graduated from Cambridge University with a master's degree in Computer Speech, Text, and Internet Technology. He then pursued a PhD at Massachusetts Institute of Technology, where he was advised by Samuel Madden. At MIT, Abadi collaborated with several researchers to propose C-Store, a column-oriented database. C-Store was commercialized by Vertica and eventually acquired by Hewlett-Packard. Abadi obtained his PhD degree in 2007, writing a dissertation titled Query Execution in Column-Oriented Database Systems.

He became an assistant professor at Yale University in 2007 and subsequently an associate professor in 2012. In 2010, a company named Hadapt commercialized his research on HadoopDB, a hybrid of relational databases and Hadoop. Hadapt was acquired by Teradata in 2014.

In 2017, he joined University of Maryland, College Park as the Darnell/Kanal Professor in Computer Science.

== Awards and recognitions ==
Abadi's 2008 dissertation Query Execution in Column-Oriented Database Systems received a SIGMOD Jim Gray Doctoral Dissertation Award in 2009. Two PhD students advised by him, Alexander Thomson and Jose Faleiro, also received this award for their dissertations.

He received a NSF CAREER award in 2009 and a Sloan Fellowship in 2011.

Abadi received VLDB's best paper award in 2007 for Scalable Semantic Web Data Management Using Vertical Partitioning and test of time award in 2015 and 2019 for C-Store: A Column-oriented DBMS and HadoopDB: An Architectural Hybrid of MapReduce and DBMS Technologies for Analytical Workloads, respectively.

He was selected as an ACM Fellow in 2020 "for contributions to stream databases, distributed databases, graph databases, and column-store databases".
