= Michael Stonebraker =

American computer scientist (born 1943)

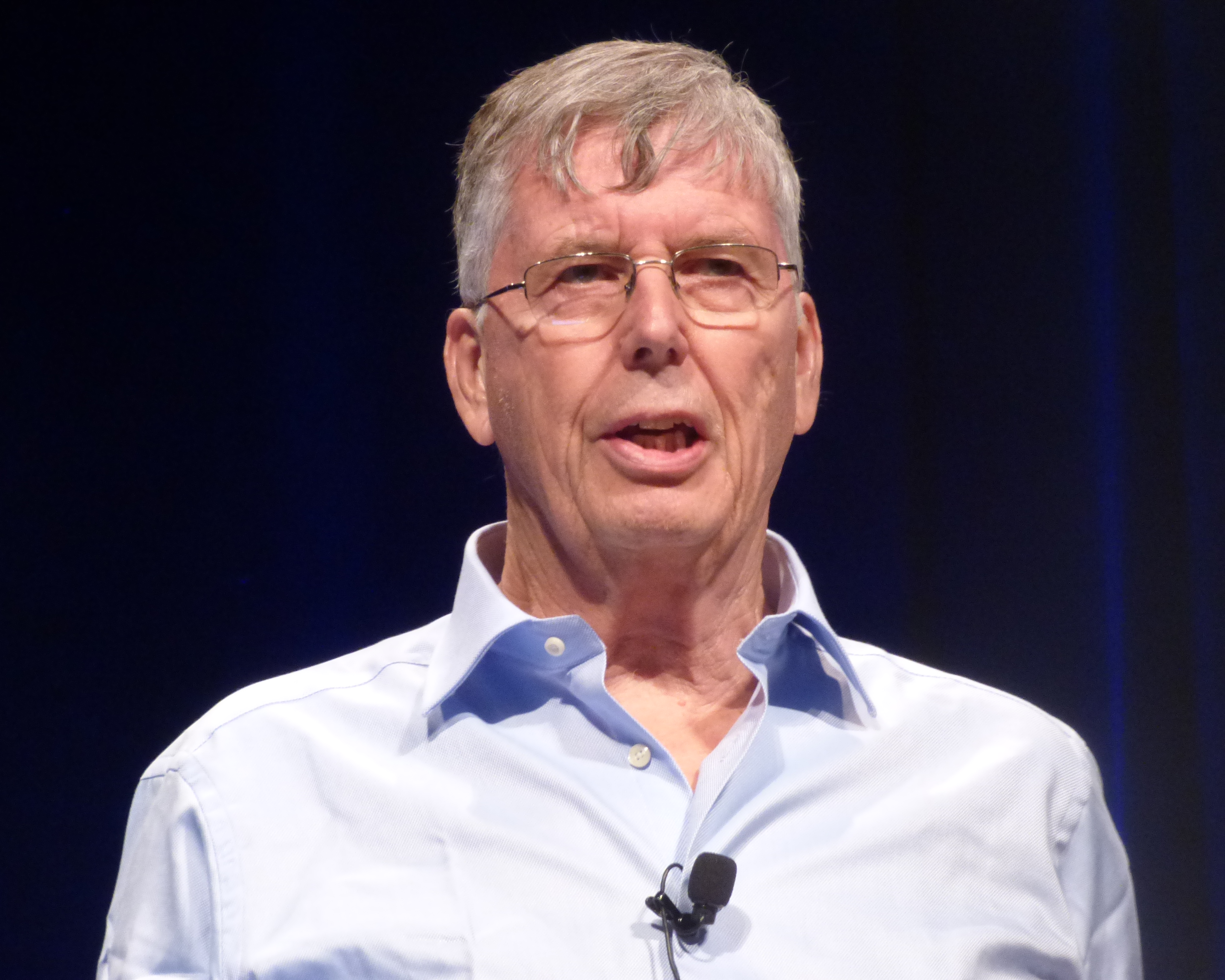
- Michael Stonebraker giving the 2015 Turing lecture
- Born: October 11, 1943 (age 83); Newburyport, Massachusetts, U.S.
- Education: Princeton University (BS); University of Michigan (MS, PhD)
- Known for: Ingres, Postgres, Vertica, Streambase, Illustra, VoltDB, SciDB
- Spouse: Beth
- Awards: IEEE John von Neumann Medal (2005); ACM Turing Award (2014)
- Scientific career
- Fields: Computer science
- Workplaces: University of California, Berkeley; University of Michigan; Massachusetts Institute of Technology
- Thesis: The Reduction of Large Scale Markov Models for Random Chains
- Doctoral advisor: Arch Waugh Naylor
- Notable students: Joseph M. Hellerstein; Sunita Sarawagi; Clifford A. Lynch; Margo Seltzer; Dale Skeen; Marti Hearst; Leilani Battle
- Website: csail.mit.edu/user/1547

Michael Ralph Stonebraker (born October 11, 1943) is an American computer scientist specializing in database systems. Through a series of academic prototypes and commercial startups, Stonebraker's research and products are central to many relational databases. He is also the founder of many database companies, including Ingres Corporation, Illustra, Paradigm4, StreamBase Systems, Tamr, Vertica, VoltDB and Hopara, and served as chief technical officer of Informix. For his contributions to database research, Stonebraker received the 2014 Turing Award, often described as "the Nobel Prize for computing."

Stonebraker's career can be broadly divided into two phases: his time at University of California, Berkeley when he focused on relational database management systems such as Ingres and Postgres, and, starting in 2001, at Massachusetts Institute of Technology (MIT) where he developed more novel data management techniques such as C-Store, H-Store, SciDB and DBOS. Stonebraker is currently a professor emeritus at UC Berkeley and an adjunct professor emeritus at MIT's Computer Science and Artificial Intelligence Laboratory. He is also known as an editor for the book Readings in Database Systems.

== Life ==
Stonebraker grew up in Milton Mills, New Hampshire. He earned his B.S.E. in electrical engineering from Princeton University in 1965, and his M.S. and Ph.D. from the University of Michigan in 1967 and 1971 respectively. His awards include the IEEE John von Neumann Medal and the first SIGMOD Edgar F. Codd Innovations Award. In 1994 he was inducted as a Fellow of the Association for Computing Machinery. In 1997, he was elected a member of the National Academy of Engineering for the development and commercialization of relational and object-relational database systems. In March 2015 it was announced he won the 2014 ACM Turing Award. In September 2015, he won the 2015 Commonwealth Award, chosen by council members of MassTLC.

=== Ingres ===
In 1973, Stonebraker and his colleague Eugene Wong started researching relational database systems after reading a series of seminal papers published by Edgar F. Codd on the relational data model.

Their project, known as Ingres (Interactive Graphics and Retrieval System), was one of the first systems (along with System R from IBM) to demonstrate that it was possible to build a practical and efficient implementation of the relational model. A number of key ideas from INGRES are still widely used in relational systems, including the use of B-trees, primary-copy replication, the query rewrite approach to views and integrity constraints, and the idea of rules/triggers for integrity checking in an RDBMS. Additionally, much experimental work was done that provided insights into how to build a locking system that could provide satisfactory transaction performance.

These included Stonebraker, who with fellow Berkeley professors Larry Rowe and Eugene Wong helped found Relational Technology, Inc., later called Ingres Corporation. Subsequently, sold to Computer Associates, Ingres was re-established as an independent company in 2005, and later renamed Actian. Other startups based on Ingres include Sybase, founded by Robert Epstein, a student on the project, and Britton Lee, Inc. Sybase's code was later used as a basis for Microsoft SQL Server.

=== Postgres ===
After founding Relational Technology, Stonebraker and Rowe began a "post-Ingres" effort, to address the limitations of the relational model. The new project was named POSTGRES (POST inGRES).

=== Mariposa and Cohera ===
After the Postgres project, Stonebraker initiated the Mariposa

=== The MIT years (2001–present) ===
==== Aurora and StreamBase ====
In the Aurora Project, Stonebraker, along with colleagues from Brandeis University, Brown University, and MIT, focused on data management for streaming data, using a new data model and query language. Unlike relational systems, which "pull" data and process it a record at a time, in Aurora, data is "pushed", arriving asynchronously from external data sources (such as stock ticks, news feeds, or sensors.) The output is itself a stream of results (such as windowed averages) that are sent to users.

==== C-Store and Vertica ====
In the C-Store project, started in 2005, Stonebraker, along with colleagues from Brandeis, Brown, MIT, and University of Massachusetts Boston, developed a parallel, shared-nothing column-oriented DBMS for data warehousing. By dividing and storing data in columns, C-Store is able to perform less I/O and get better compression ratios than conventional database systems that store data in rows.

Stonebraker explained that it's because similar data items are side-by-side: Name,Name,Name,Name vs. Name,Address,Zip,Phone#. In 2005, Stonebraker co-founded Vertica to commercialize the technology behind C-Store.

==== SciDB ====
In 2008, along with David DeWitt and researchers from Brown, MIT, Portland State University, SLAC, the University of Washington, and the University of Wisconsin–Madison, Stonebraker started SciDB an open-source DBMS specially designed for scientific research applications.

He founded Paradigm4 with Marilyn Matz, who became CEO. Paradigm4 developed SciDB, used mostly by life sciences and financial markets. Novartis, Foundation Medicine, and the National Institutes of Health are some of the company's clients.

==== NoSQL ====
In 2010 and 2011, Stonebraker criticized the NoSQL movement.

== Selected works ==
- Joseph M. Hellerstein; Michael Stonebraker (2015). Readings in Database Systems (5th ed.). MIT Press.
- Michael Stonebraker; Randy Katz, David Patterson, John Ousterhout (1988). "THE DESIGN OF XPRS" (PDF). VLDB: 318–330.
