= Dean Stoecker =

American billionaire

- Born: Dean A. Stoecker; 1956 or 1957 (age 68–69); Colorado, US
- Education: University of Colorado; Pepperdine University
- Occupations: Software developer and businessman
- Known for: Co-founder, chairman and former CEO of Alteryx
- Spouse: Angie

Dean A. Stoecker (born 1956/1957) is an American businessman, and the co-founder (in 1997), chairman and former CEO (1997 – 2020) of Alteryx, a computer software company.

Stoecker was born and grew up in Colorado. His family is from Boulder, Colorado, where his "father was an entrepreneur who built A-Frame houses", and Dean was the youngest child.

He earned a bachelor's degree from the University of Colorado, and an MBA from Pepperdine University.

In August 2019, Forbes assessed Stoecker's net worth at $1.2 billion, following Alteryx's near 900% share price rise since its 2017 IPO.

He was a district-level delegate to the 2016 Republican National Convention from California.

He is married to Angie. They live in Irvine, California.
