= Samuel Madden (computer scientist) =

American computer scientist (born 1976)

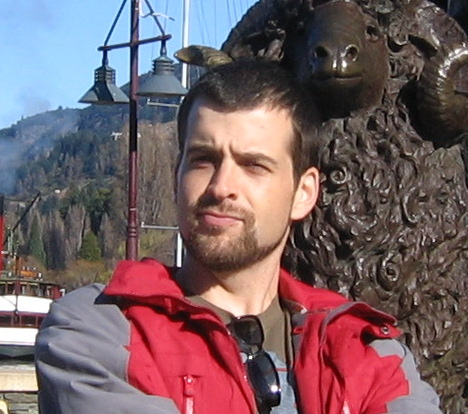
- Madden in 2008
- Born: August 4, 1976 (age 50); San Diego, California, U.S.
- Education: Massachusetts Institute of Technology (B.S. and M.Eng., 1999); UC Berkeley (PhD, 2003)
- Known for: C-Store, Vertica, TinyDB, TelegraphCQ, H-Store
- Awards: SIGMOD Edgar F. Codd Innovations Award (2024); ACM Fellow (2020); Sloan Research Fellowship (2007); NSF CAREER Award (2004)
- Scientific career
- Fields: Computer Science
- Workplaces: Massachusetts Institute of Technology
- Doctoral advisor: Michael J. Franklin and Joseph M. Hellerstein
- Doctoral students: Daniel Abadi
- Website: db.csail.mit.edu/madden

Samuel R. Madden (born August 4, 1976) is an American computer scientist specializing in database management systems. He is a professor of computer science and faculty head of computer science in the EECS department at the Massachusetts Institute of Technology. Madden is known for his work on column-oriented database systems, high-performance transaction processing, and systems for mobile and sensor data. He is a fellow of the Association for Computing Machinery and a recipient of the SIGMOD Edgar F. Codd Innovations Award.

== Early life and education ==
Madden was born and raised in San Diego, California. While in high school and as an undergraduate, he wrote printer driver software for Palomar Software, a San Diego-area Macintosh software company.

He earned bachelor's and master's degrees from MIT in 1999. He then pursued a PhD in computer science at the University of California, Berkeley, where his dissertation focused on query processing for sensor networks, under the supervision of Michael J. Franklin and Joseph M. Hellerstein. During his doctoral studies, he contributed to the TelegraphCQ continuous query processing system.

== Career ==
After completing his doctorate in 2003, Madden held a postdoctoral position at Intel's Berkeley Research center before joining MIT as a tenure-track professor.

At MIT, Madden has led or contributed to several influential database research projects, including TinyDB, Aurora/Borealis, C-Store, and H-Store. In recent years, his group has focused on declarative and agent-driven data systems for managing and optimizing AI-powered analytical workloads.

Madden is a co-founder of Vertica Systems and Cambridge Mobile Telematics. He is also a Technology Expert at Omega Venture Partners.

In 2024, he was appointed the faculty head of computer science at MIT.

== Awards and recognitions ==
Madden won a National Science Foundation CAREER Award in 2004 and a Sloan Research Fellowship in 2007.

He received VLDB's best paper award in 2007 and VLDB's test of time award in 2015 for his 2005 paper on C-Store.

He also received a test of time award at SIGMOD 2013 for his 2003 paper The Design of an Acquisitional Query Processor for Sensor Networks.

In 2020, he was named a fellow of the Association for Computing Machinery.

He received the 2024 SIGMOD Edgar F. Codd Innovations Award for his contributions to column-oriented database systems, high-performance transaction processing, and systems for mobile and sensor data.
