= Rhizome Navigation =

Method of Web Navigation

Rhizome Navigation is a method of dynamically creating a navigation interface for data systems, such as websites and databases. The navigation links presented to the user are not predefined, they are generated in response to user behavior, and analysis of other data.

The word rhizome is used as a metaphor, to compare the growth and structure of rhizome navigation interfaces with the complex organic growth and structure of rhizomes, underground plant stems that send out roots and shoots from their nodes.

== Examples of use ==
A good example of rhizome navigation in use can be found in the program Enronic. In their investigation into the Enron scandal, the Federal Energy Regulatory Commission made a large portion of Enron's email database available to the public. Enronic analyzes these email messages to display the relationships between Enron employees, based on who emailed whom and how often. The program uses Prefuse, an open source Java library for creating visual representations of data.

Rhizome Navigation is an open source project which aims to provide useful text and graphical navigation aids to users of websites and databases, by analysing the navigation selections of previous users.
