= Jeffrey Heer =

American computer scientist

Jeffrey Michael Heer
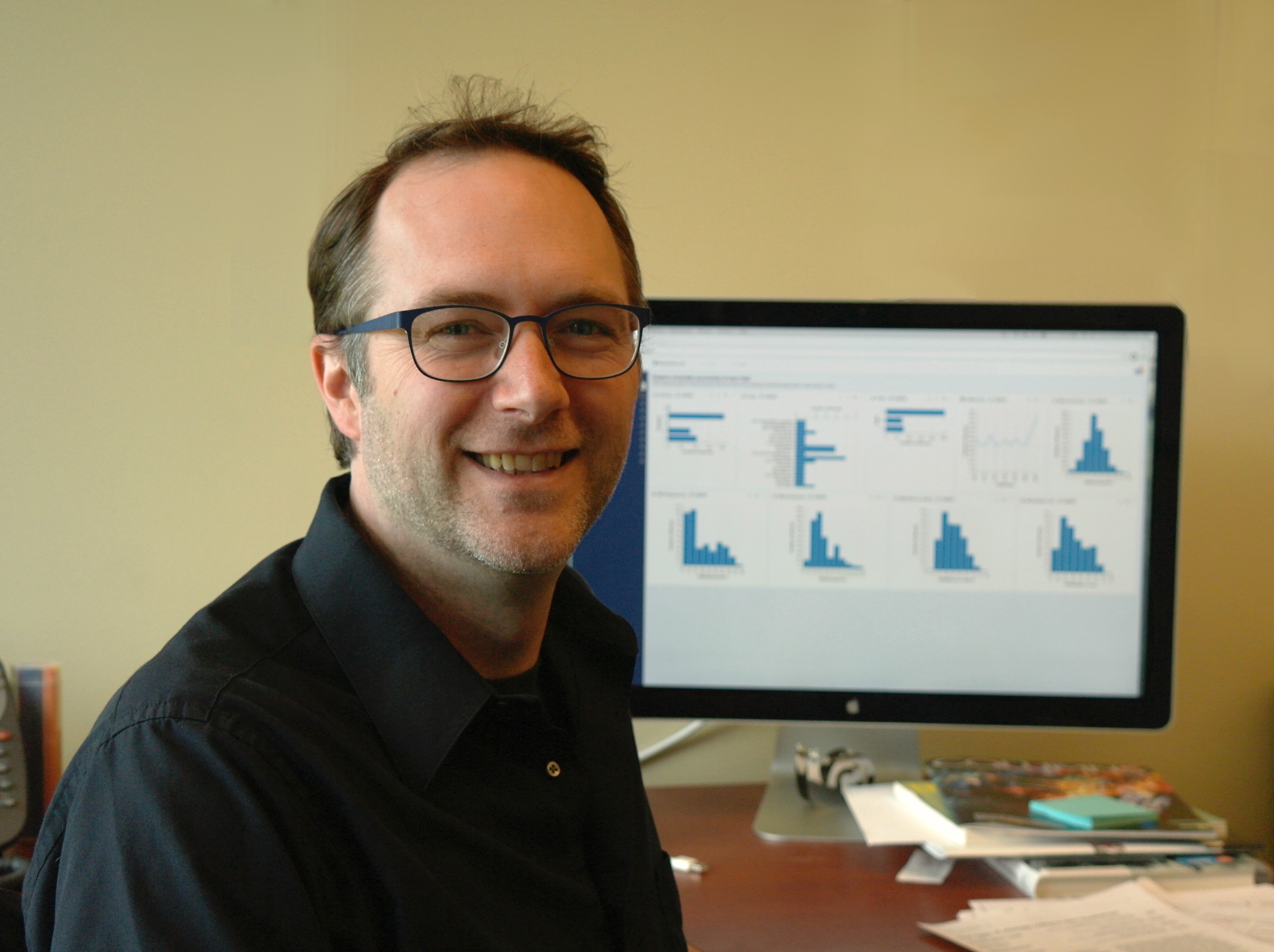
- Heer in 2016
- Born: June 15, 1979 (age 47)
- Education: University of California, Berkeley (BS, MS, PhD)
- Known for: Data visualization
- Awards: TR35, Sloan Fellowship, ACM Grace Murray Hopper Award
- Scientific career
- Fields: Computer science
- Workplaces: University of Washington, Stanford University
- Doctoral advisor: Maneesh Agrawala
- Doctoral students: Mike Bostock; Sean Kandel
- Website: homes.cs.washington.edu/~jheer

Jeffrey Michael Heer (born June 15, 1979) is an American computer scientist best known for his work on information visualization and interactive data analysis. He is a professor of computer science & engineering at the University of Washington, where he directs the UW Interactive Data Lab. He co-founded Trifacta with Joe Hellerstein and Sean Kandel in 2012.

== Education ==
Heer received a B.S., M.S. and PhD from the University of California, Berkeley. As a graduate student at UC Berkeley, he developed the Prefuse and Flare visualization toolkits.

== Research and career ==
Heer was an assistant professor of computer science at Stanford University, from 2009 to 2013. He is also co-founder and chief experience officer of Trifacta. Heer's research focuses on new systems and techniques for data visualization. As a member of the Stanford University faculty, he worked with Mike Bostock on the Protovis and D3.js systems.

Heer then moved to the University of Washington where he worked with students and collaborators to develop the Vega and Vega-Lite visualisation grammars. Along with Joe Hellerstein and Sean Kandel, Heer has also developed interactive tools for data transformation (including Data Wrangler), leading to the founding of Trifacta. Other research contributions include work on the graphical perception of visualizations, social data analysis, text visualization, and interactive language translation tools.

== Awards and recognition ==
Heer's research has been recognized by an ACM Grace Murray Hopper Award, a Gordon and Betty Moore Foundation Data-Driven Discovery Investigator Award, an Alfred P. Sloan Fellowship, and MIT Technology Review's TR35 list. Heer and his students have won best paper awards at human-computer interaction and visualization conferences. His work has also appeared in the popular press.

Heer was named as an ACM Fellow, in the 2024 class of fellows, "for contributions to information visualization, human-centered data science, and interactive machine learning".
