= Cambridge Mobile Telematics =

- Logo of Cambridge Mobile Telematics
- Founded: 2010
- Founder: Hari Balakrishnan, Samuel R. Madden, and William V. Powers
- Headquarters: Cambridge, Massachusetts, United States.
- Key people: William V. Powers (CEO), Hari Balakrishnan (CTO & chairperson), Samuel R. Madden (chief scientist), and Bill Bradley (SVP of AI).
- Products: Safest Driver, StreetVision.
- Website: cmtelematics.com

Cambridge Mobile Telematics is an American technology company based in Cambridge, Massachusetts. The company was founded by Hari Balakrishnan, Samuel R. Madden, and William V. Powers. The company has also collaborated research with Stanford University and the University of Pennsylvania on telematics research and driver risk assessment.

== History ==
The company was founded in 2010 by Hari Balakrishnan, Samuel Madden, and William Powers as a spin-off from the CarTel project at the Massachusetts Institute of Technology’s Computer Science and Artificial Intelligence Laboratory (CSAIL). In 2018, the company received a $500 million investment from the SoftBank Vision Fund.

Cambridge Mobile has acquired the U.S. telematics provider TrueMotion in 2021 and the European firm Amodo in 2023.

The company has developed driver-safety programs, including Safest Driver, which has been used in Boston, Los Angeles, and Seattle.

The company has also collaborated with Hyundai, Verizon, ADT, Uber, DoorDash, and AARP on telematics, driver safety, and crash-detection technologies.

== Research ==
The company has published research on driver behavior, fuel use, and insurance claims. A 2022 company study found that households owning both electric and gasoline vehicles increased their use of electric cars as gasoline prices rose.Another analysis of 100,000 drivers in usage-based insurance programs reported reductions in distracted driving, speeding, and hard braking among the most engaged users, which the study linked to lower injury claim rates.
