= Boon Thau Loo =

American computer scientist

- Born: Malaysia
- Occupations: Professor; college administrator; technology entrepreneur
- Known for: Declarative networking MCIT Online; Co-founding companies Netsil and Termaxia

Academic background
- Education: Stanford University; University of California, Berkeley (PhD)
- Thesis: The Design and Implementation of Declarative Networks (2006)
- Doctoral advisor: Joseph M. Hellerstein; Ion Stoica

Academic work
- Discipline: Computer Science
- Institutions: University of Pennsylvania
- Website: https://boonloo.cis.upenn.edu/

Boon Thau Loo is a Singaporean-American computer scientist, college administrator, and technology entrepreneur. He is the RCA professor in the Computer and Information Science department at the University of Pennsylvania where he leads a research lab working on distributed systems, and is the Associate Dean for Graduate Programs at the University of Pennsylvania School of Engineering and Applied Science.

== Early life ==
Boon Thau Loo was born in Malaysia and grew up in Singapore. He studied at The Chinese High School and Raffles Junior College. In 1996, he moved to the United States in order to attend the University of California, Berkeley, where he received an undergraduate degree in Electrical Engineering and Computer Science. Following his studies there, he pursued his master's degree in computer science at Stanford University. He then returned to Berkeley for his PhD, which he graduated in 2006 with the David J. Sakrison Memorial Prize dissertation award and the 2007 ACM SIGMOD Dissertation Award for his thesis The Design and Implementation of Declarative Networks. Loo then began working as a post-doctoral researcher at Microsoft Research.

== Academic career ==
Loo is the RCA professor of artificial intelligence at the University of Pennsylvania in the departments of Computer and Information Science and Electrical and Systems Engineering. He is also the director of the Distributed Systems Laboratory and the NetDB@Penn research group. In 2018, he became the associate dean of master's and professional programs, where he oversees the Master's and professional programs in the School of Engineering and Applied Science. He has published over 150 papers and two books - Declarative Networking (Synthesis Lectures on Data Management) in 2012 and Datalog and Recursive Query Processing (Foundations and Trends(r) in Databases) in 2013. In 2019, Loo received the University of Pennsylvania Emerging Inventor of the Year award, given annually to one Penn faculty member for success in technology transfer. In July 2020, Loo was appointed Associate Dean for Graduate Programs, where he oversees the doctoral, master's and professional programs at Penn Engineering.

== Business career ==
While on sabbatical leave from Penn in 2014, Loo cofounded and led Gencore Systems, a Penn startup company on cloud performance monitoring. Gencore Systems was one of the first faculty-led startups from Penn's Computer Science department. Leading a group of his former students that spun off the company with him, Loo formed a partnership with the OpenLab of Juniper Networks and integrated his group's research on high-performance declarative network analytics into Juniper's newly acquired Contrail SDN platform. The company raised seed funding in addition to a SBIR (Small Business Innovative Research) grant from the National Science Foundation. The company was later renamed Netsil and acquired by Nutanix in 2018 for up to 74 million US dollars in stock. In 2015, Loo also cofounded Termaxia, a big data storage company, where he served as Chief Scientist. In 2020, the company was acquired by Frontiir.

== Recognition ==
- Lindback Award for Distinguished Teaching, awarded by the University of Pennsylvania, 2022
- Best paper award at the 23rd International Conference on Extending Database Technology, 30 March-2 April 2020
- Air Force Office of Scientific Research Young Investigator Program award, 2012
- ACM SIGMOD Dissertation Award, 2007
- David J. Sakrison Memorial Prize, 2006
- Computing Research Association Outstanding Undergraduate Awards (Honorable mention), 1999
