= C-Store =

Database management system

C-Store is a database management system (DBMS) based on a column-oriented DBMS developed by a team at Brown University, Brandeis University, Massachusetts Institute of Technology and the University of Massachusetts Boston including Michael Stonebraker, Stanley Zdonik, and Samuel Madden. The last release of the original code was in 2006; Vertica a commercial fork, lives on.

C-Store differs from most traditional relational database management system (RDBMS) designs in many ways, primarily in that it stores data by column and not by row, optimizing the database for reading of data rather than writing.

C-Store is licensed under the BSD license. Stonebraker and his colleagues have formed Vertica, a company to commercialize C-Store.

== See also ==
- H-Store

== Bibliography ==
- Stonebraker, Mike; et al. (2005). "C-Store: A Column-oriented DBMS" (PDF). Proceedings of the 31st VLDB Conference. Trondheim, Norway. Archived from the original (PDF) on 2010-06-19.
