= Paxata =

American private software company

- Type: Private
- Industry: Enterprise analytics software
- Founded: January 2012; 14 years ago
- Headquarters: Redwood City, CA
- Area served: Worldwide
- Key people: Prakash Nanduri (Co-Founder & CEO); Dave Brewster (Co-Founder & CTO); Chris Maddox (Co-Founder & VP of Business Development); Nenshad Bardoliwalla (Co-Founder & Chief Product Officer)
- Products: The Paxata suite of self-service data preparation software

Paxata is a privately owned software company headquartered in Redwood City, California. It develops self-service data preparation software that gets data ready for data analytics software. Paxata's software is intended for business analysts, as opposed to technical staff. It is used to combine data from different sources, then check it for data quality issues, such as duplicates and outliers. Algorithms and machine learning automate certain aspects of data preparation and users work with the software through a user-interface similar to Excel spreadsheets.

The company was founded in January 2012 and operated in stealth mode until October 2013. It received more than $10 million in venture funding before being acquired by DataRobot in 2019.

== History ==
Paxata was founded in January 2012. It initially raised $2 million in venture capital. The company came out of stealth mode in October 2013. Simultaneously with its public release, Paxata announced an $8 million funding round led by Accel Partners. Adoption of the software grew quickly. In March 2014, In-Q-Tel acquired an interest in the startup. It raised an additional $18 million in funding in September 2015. It also began working with Cisco to jointly develop the Cisco Data Preparation suite of software and services.

== Software ==
Paxata refers to its suite of cloud-based data quality, integration, enrichment and governance products as "Adaptive Data Preparation." The software is intended for business analysts, who need to combine data from a variety of sources, then check the data for duplicates, empty fields, outliers, trends and integrity issues before conducting analysis or visualization in a third-party software tool. It uses algorithms and machine-learning to automate certain aspects of data preparation. For example, it may automatically detect records belonging to the same person or address, even if the information is formatted differently in each record in different data sets.

The software has a spreadsheet-based user interface. Patterns and anomalies in the data are color-coded in the spreadsheet. Then users are provided with instructions on how to resolve data quality issues or to supplement the data with contextual information. Data sets and related quality issues can also be addressed in a collaborative environment through the "Paxata Share" feature. It runs on Apache Spark.

According to analyst firm Ovum, the software is made possible through advances in predictive analytics, machine learning and the NoSQL data caching methodology. The software uses semantic algorithms to understand the meaning of a data table's columns and pattern recognition algorithms to find potential duplicates in a data-set. It also uses indexing, text pattern recognition and other technologies traditionally found in social media and search software. One of the software's users is dairy producer Danone, which uses the software so that business staff can create their own reports on merchandising, supply chain and product data, without the IT department.

Paxata's spreadsheet-based user interface

== Reception ==
In its 2014 report "Cool Vendors in Data Integration and Data Quality", Gartner praised Paxata for developing a "business-user-friendly" data quality product that does not use code. Ventana Research said its spreadsheet-based user interface "should resonate well with business analysts," who are resistant to move away from familiar Excel-like programs. Gartner also said Paxata was recognized in the report due to its automated, algorithm-based features and how it tracks any changes made to the data.

Ventana Research said Paxata was in a "noisy marketplace". According to Gartner, while Paxata is an early entrant into the market, many startups and large corporations are making investments in developing similar competing products. According to Gigaom and IT Business Edge, one way Paxata differs is that it automatically merges multiple data-sets into a single table, so it can be easily imported into a visualization or analysis tool.

Gartner said Paxata will have a difficult time finding a compelling pricing model, when many data discovery tools that it supplements provide some similar features. In contrast, Ventana said Paxata's pricing was "a pretty small amount" compared to the amount of time users can save.
