= Jeffrey Naughton =

American computer scientist

- Education: University of Wisconsin-Madison (BS); Stanford University (PhD)
- Awards: Association for Computing Machinery Fellow (2002); Presidential Young Investigator Award (1991)
- Scientific career
- Fields: Computer science Computer databases
- Workplaces: Google; University of Wisconsin-Madison; Princeton University
- Doctoral advisor: Jeffrey Ullman
- Website: https://www.cs.wisc.edu/~naughton

Jeffrey Naughton is a computer scientist and former professor and department chair of Computer Sciences at the University of Wisconsin–Madison, where he was one of the leaders of the Wisconsin Database Group. He was lead of Google's Madison office until 2022.

== Career ==
Naughton received a bachelor's degree from the University of Wisconsin–Madison in 1982 and a Ph.D. from Stanford University in 1987. He was a member of the faculty at Princeton University from 1987-1989.

Professor Naughton is a Fellow of the ACM, recipient of the University of Wisconsin Vilas Award for excellence in research, and author of over 100 technical papers. In addition, he was the recipient of the Wisconsin Student ACM Chapter (SACM) "Cow Award" for excellence in classroom teaching.

Naughton joined Google in February 2016. He was a distinguished scientist and the site lead of Google Madison until 2022. He is currently a Technical Fellow at Snowflake.
