= SciDB =

Database software product

- Developer: Prof. Michael Stonebraker
- Type: Database management system
- Website: www.paradigm4.com

SciDB was a column-oriented database management system (DBMS) designed for multidimensional data management and analytics common to scientific, geospatial, financial, and industrial applications.

== History ==
Stonebraker showed that arrays are 100 times faster in SciDB than in a relational DBMS on a class of problems. It is swapping rows and columns for mathematical arrays that put fewer restrictions on the data and can work in any number of dimensions unlike the conventionally widely used relational database management system model, in which each relation supports only one dimension of records.

A 2011 conference presentation on SciDB promoted it as "not Hadoop".

== See also ==
- Comparison of object database management systems
- Comparison of structured storage software
