= VoltDB =

Relational database management system program

Volt Active Data
- Developer: Volt Active Data
- Release: May 25, 2010
- Stable release: 11.3 / April 21, 2022; 4 years ago
- Written in: Java, C++
- Operating system: Linux, macOS
- Platform: Java
- Type: RDBMS
- License: GNU Affero General Public License v3, VoltDB Proprietary License
- Website: voltactivedata.com

Volt Active Data (formerly VoltDB) is an in-memory database designed by Michael Stonebraker, Sam Madden, and Daniel Abadi. That team had started an experimental version called H-Store while working at a set of US universities.

It is an ACID-compliant RDBMS that uses a shared-nothing architecture, and is derived from work done by Stonebraker on OLTP system performance and optimization.

It is available in both enterprise and community editions. The community edition is licensed under the GNU Affero General Public License.

== Architecture ==
VoltDB is a NewSQL OLTP relational database that supports SQL access from within pre-compiled Java stored procedures.

While direct SQL access is supported, the most efficient form of interaction is using stored procedure calls, as it involves fewer network trips. Stored procedures are written in Java by extending a class called VoltProcedure' and implementing a ‘run()’ method that includes both SQL statements and supporting Java logic. Internally data is managed by a C++ core to avoid garbage collection issues.

VoltDB relies on horizontal partitioning down to the individual hardware thread to scale, k-safety (synchronous replication) to provide high availability, and a combination of continuous snapshots and command logging for durability (crash recovery).

VoltDB is based on H-Store. It uses a shared-nothing architecture to scale. Data and the processing associated with it are distributed across the CPU cores within the servers composing a single VoltDB cluster. By extending its shared-nothing foundation to the per-core level, VoltDB scales with the increasing core-per-CPU counts on multi-core servers.

By making stored procedures the unit of transaction and executing them at the partition containing the necessary data, it is possible to eliminate round trip messaging between SQL statements. Stored procedures are executed serially and to completion in a single thread without locking or latching, similar to the LMAX architecture. Because data is in memory and local to the partition, a stored procedure can execute in microseconds. VoltDB's stored procedure initiation scheme allows all nodes to initiate stored procedures while avoiding a single serializable global order.

VoltDB is ACID compliant. Data is written to durable storage. Durability is ensured by continuous snapshots; asynchronous command logging, which creates both snapshots and a log of transactions between snapshots; and synchronous command logging, which logs transactions after the transaction completes and before it is committed to the database. This ensures that no transactions are committed that are not logged and that no transactions are lost.

== History ==
=== H-Store ===
H-Store
- Developers: Brown, CMU, MIT, Yale
- Stable release: June 2016 / June 3, 2016; 10 years ago
- Written in: C++, Java
- Operating system: Linux, Mac OS X
- Type: Database Management System
- License: BSD License, GPL
- Website: hstore.cs.brown.edu

H-Store was an experimental database management system (DBMS). It was designed for online transaction processing applications. H-Store was developed by a team at Brown University, Carnegie Mellon University, the Massachusetts Institute of Technology, and Yale University in 2007 by researchers Michael Stonebraker, Sam Madden, Andy Pavlo and Daniel Abadi.

H-Store was promoted as a new class of parallel database management systems, called NewSQL, that provide the high-throughput and high-availability of NoSQL systems, but without giving up the transactional consistency of a traditional DBMS known as ACID (atomicity, consistency, isolation and durability). Such systems operate across multiple machines, as opposed to a single, more powerful, more expensive machine.

H-Store was able to execute transaction processing with high throughput by forgoing many features of traditional relational database management systems. H-Store was designed as a parallel system to run on a cluster of shared-nothing, main memory executor nodes (processor + memory + storage). The database is partitioned into disjoint subsets each assigned to a single-threaded execution engine assigned to one core on one node. Each engine has exclusive access to all of the data in its partition. Because it is single-threaded, only one transaction at a time can access the data stored on that partition. No physical locks or latches are included in the system, and once a transaction is started, it cannot stall waiting for another transaction to complete. Throughput is increased by increasing the number of nodes in the system and reducing partition sizes.

H-Store was licensed under the BSD license and GPL licenses. By 2009, the VoltDB company developed a commercial version. The final release of H-store was in 2016.

=== VoltDB ===
VoltDB v5.0 introduced a database monitoring and management tool, the VoltDB Management Center (VMC for short). VMC provides browser-based one-stop monitoring and configuration management of the VoltDB database, including graphs for cluster throughput and latency as well as CPU and memory usage for the current server.

VoltDB version 5.1, released in March 2015, introduced database replication (DR) functionality, removing any single point of failure. DR provides simultaneous, parallel replication of multiple partitions and binary logs of transaction results, saving the replica from having to replay the transaction.

V6.0 introduced geospatial datatypes

V6.1 added streams, which can be inserted into, with support for aggregation in materialized views on the streaming data,.

V6.6 added support for XDCR running clusters between mixed versions of Volt and of mixed sizes and configurations.

V7.1 , released in March 2017 introduced support for TLS encryption for client networking.

V7.5 released July 28, 2017 introduced the kafkaloader, for consuming streaming events from Kafka directly into a database table or into a stored procedure for processing.

V7.6 (August 28, 2017) introduced User-Defined SQL Functions, allowing customers to write custom functions in Java and make them callable from a SQL statement. V8.0 (February 6, 2018) introduced TLS encryption for networking between clusters using DR and XDCR and for intra-cluster communication.

V8.2 (July 12, 2018) introduced the TTL feature that allows applications to define a "time to live" on timestamp column in a table. Once the expiration time is hit, an internal process cleans up the records from the database.

V8.4 (December 29, 2018) introduced Long-Term Supported versions to Volt customers. This version increases the support from one year to three years, allowing customers to stay on a version and receive critical updates for stability, security and correctness. V9.0 (April 11, 2019) introduced new streaming functionality, including migration of data to a stream upon expiration and change-data capture.

V9.3 (May 1, 2020), a Long-Term Supported (LTS) release, introduced Scheduled Tasks, a way to automate repetitive tasks and procedure calls from within Volt. Schedule Tasks has an easy-to-use interface for calling pre-defined procedures and can also be fully customized in Java to create more complex schedules.

V10.0 (August, 2020) introduced a Volt Operator for Kubernetes and Helm Charts offering a complete solution for running VoltDB databases in a Kubernetes cloud environment. In addition V10.0 provided a Prometheus agent for collection and graphing of metrics.

V10.2 (January 2021) introduced VoltDB Topics to provide the intelligent streaming of VoltDB's existing import and export capabilities, but with the flexibility of Kafka-like streams. Topics allow for both inbound and outbound streaming to multiple client producers and consumers. They allow for intelligent processing and manipulation of the data as it passes through the pipeline. V10.2 is a LTS release.

V11.0 (April 21, 2022) introduces connectivity to DataDog, support for Java 17, compatibility with Kubernetes 22.0 and priority transactions.

In February 2022 the product was renamed to "Volt Active Data".

== See also ==
- Comparison of database tools
- Comparison of relational database management systems
