= Vertica =

Software company

- Industry: Database management & Data warehousing
- Founded: 2005
- Founder: Andrew Palmer and Michael Stonebraker
- Headquarters: Cambridge, MA, United States
- Key people: Milan Shetti (CEO)
- Products: Vertica Analytics Database, Vertica SQL on Data Lake
- Parent: Rocket Software
- Website: www.vertica.com

Vertica is a column-oriented analytical database management system designed for large-scale data warehousing and analytics workloads. The platform is based on research from the C-Store academic project and was founded in 2005 by database researcher Michael Stonebraker, with Andrew Palmer serving as the company's first chief executive officer.

Vertica uses a columnar storage architecture and massively parallel processing (MPP) design to support analytical queries across distributed computing environments. The platform is available for deployment on-premises, in private clouds, and on public cloud infrastructure.

== History ==
In March 2011, Vertica was acquired by Hewlett-Packard (HP) and became part of HP Software. Following the 2017 merger of Hewlett Packard Enterprise's software business with Micro Focus, Vertica became a Micro Focus product portfolio company. In January 2023, Vertica became part of OpenText through OpenText's acquisition of Micro Focus.

In May 2026, Rocket Software acquired Vertica from OpenText as part of Rocket Software's expansion of its data, analytics, and modernization portfolio.

== Technology ==
Vertica is a column-oriented analytical database that uses massively parallel processing to distribute storage and query execution across multiple nodes. The platform supports SQL-based analytics and is designed primarily for reporting, business intelligence, data warehousing, and large-scale analytical workloads.

Vertica's key architectural features include:

- Column-oriented storage organization, which increases performance of sequential record access at the expense of common transactional operations such as single record retrieval, updates, and deletes.
- Massively parallel processing (MPP) architecture to distribute queries on independent nodes and scale performance linearly.
- Standard SQL interface with many analytics capabilities built-in, such as time series gap filling/interpolation, event-based windowing and sessionization, pattern matching, event series joins, statistical computation (e.g., regression analysis), and geospatial analysis.
- In-database machine learning including categorization, fitting and prediction without down-sampling and data movement. Vertica offers a variety of in-database algorithms, including linear regression, logistic regression, k-means clustering, Naive Bayes classification, random forest decision trees, XGBoost, and support vector machine regression and classification. It also allows deployment of ML models to multiple clusters.
- High compression, possible because columns of homogeneous datatype are stored together and because updates to the main store are batched.
- Automated workload management, data replication, server recovery, query optimization, and storage optimization.
- Native integration with open source big data technologies like Apache Kafka and Apache Spark.
- Support for standard programming interfaces, including ODBC, JDBC, ADO.NET, and OLEDB.
- High-performance and parallel data transfer to statistical tools and built-in machine learning algorithms.

Vertica's specialized approach aims to significantly increase query performance in data warehouses, while reducing hardware costs.

In 2018, Vertica introduced Eon Mode, an architecture that separates compute and storage resources. Under this model, data is stored in shared object storage while compute resources can be added or removed independently. The design enables multiple workloads to access a common data repository while operating in isolated compute environments.

Vertica includes built-in analytical and machine learning capabilities that can be executed directly within the database. Supported functions include statistical analysis, time-series operations, geospatial analysis, clustering, regression, classification, and model deployment.

Vertica integrates with a range of data engineering, business intelligence, and analytics tools. The platform supports Apache Kafka for streaming ingestion, Apache Spark for distributed data processing, containerized deployments using Docker and Kubernetes, and visualization platforms such as Grafana.

== Optimizations ==
Vertica originated as the C-Store column-oriented database, an open source research project at MIT and other universities, published in 2005.

Vertica runs on clusters of commodity servers or on commercial clouds. It integrates with Hadoop, using HDFS.

In 2018, Vertica introduced Vertica in Eon Mode, a separation of compute and storage architecture. The Eon architecture allows for elastic increase and decrease in compute capability as needed for workload elasticity. It also allows instantiation of multiple isolated sub-clusters dedicated to different workloads while maintaining a single shared data repository. It operates on shared object storage in the cloud, and also runs on object storage compatible hardware on-premises for private cloud implementations.

Version 10.1.1 of Vertica introduced Docker and Kubernetes support.

Many BI, data visualization, and ETL tools work with Vertica Analytics Platform. Vertica supports Kafka for streaming data ingestion.

In 2021, Vertica released a connector for Spark.

Vertica also integrates with Grafana, Helm, Go, and Distributed R.

== Company events ==
In January 2008, Sybase filed a patent-infringement lawsuit against Vertica. In January 2010, Vertica prevailed in a preliminary hearing, and in June, 2010, Sybase and Vertica resolved the suit, with the court dismissing all infringement claims.

Since 2013, Vertica has hosted an annual user conference, later branded as Vertica Unify, for customers, partners, and developers.
