= Trifacta =

International software company

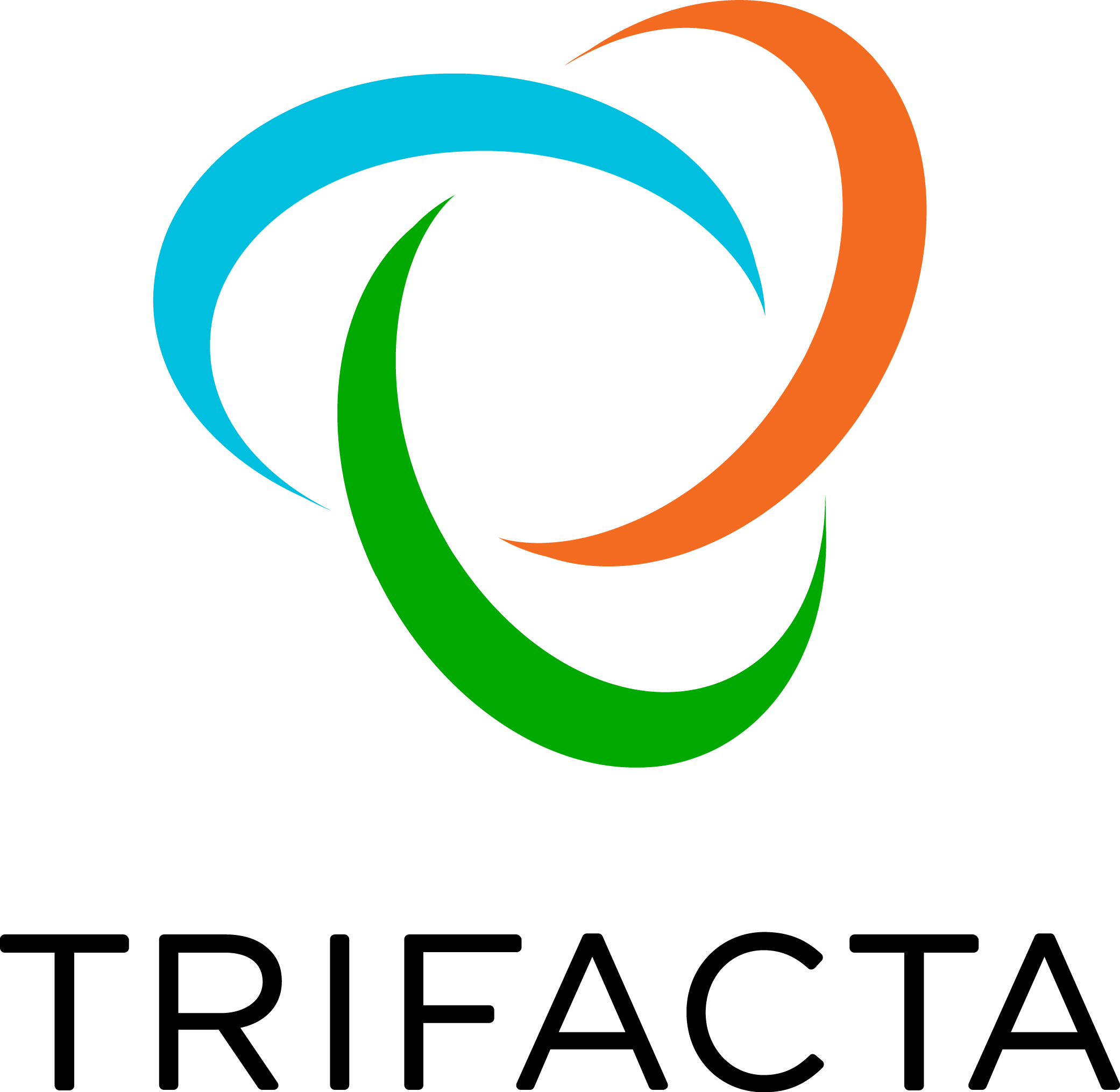
- Type: Subsidiary
- Industry: Data wrangling & exploratory analysis
- Founded: October 2012; 14 years ago
- Founders: Joe Hellerstein; Jeffrey Heer; Sean Kandel
- Headquarters: San Francisco, California, U.S.
- Number of locations: San Francisco, Palo Alto, Boston, Berlin and London
- Area served: Worldwide
- Key people: Adam Wilson (CEO); Joe Hellerstein (CSO); Jeffrey Heer (CXO); Sean Kandel (CTO)
- Products: Wrangler; Wrangler Pro; Wrangler Enterprise
- Number of employees: 500
- Parent: Alteryx
- Website: www.trifacta.com

Trifacta is a privately owned software company headquartered in San Francisco with offices in Bangalore, Boston, Berlin and London. The company was founded in October 2012 and primarily develops data wrangling software for data exploration and self-service data preparation on cloud and on-premises data platforms.

Its platform, also named Trifacta, is "designed for analysts to explore, transform, and enrich raw data into clean and structured formats." Trifacta utilizes techniques in machine learning, data visualization, human-computer interaction, and parallel processing so non-technical users can work with large datasets.

== History ==
The company was developed from a joint research project with Ph.D. and UC Berkeley Professor Joe Hellerstein, Ph.D. and University of Washington and former Stanford professor Jeffrey Heer, and Stanford Ph.D. Sean Kandel. The company created a software application that combines visual interaction with intelligent inference for the process of data transformation and was launched in October 2012; to date, Trifacta has raised over $76 million in funding from Accel Partners, Greylock Partners, Ignition Partners and Cathay Innovation. The company also has investments from X/Seed Capital, Data Collective and angel investors Dave Goldberg, Venky Harinarayan and Anand Rajaraman.

=== Milestones ===
- Sep 2001: Potter's Wheel: An Interactive Data Cleaning System
- Feb 2011: Launch of Data Wrangler Alpha
- April 2012: Trifacta founded by Joe Hellerstein, Jeffrey Heer, and Sean Kandel
- October 2012: Series A Funding $4.3M from Accel, Led by Ping Li, head of the firm's Big Data Fund
- April 2013: Alpha release of Trifacta Data Transformation
- December 2013: Series B funding $12M led by Greylock and Joseph Ansanelli of Greylock joined the board
- February 2014: Data Transformation Platform 1.0 Introduced
- March 2014: Strategic partnership formed with Cloudera
- April 2014: Trifacta named "One of the 10 Hot Hadoop Start Ups to Watch", Opens San Francisco Office
- May 2014: Series C Funding $25M led by Ignition and Ignition's Frank Artale joined the board
- July 2014: Adam Wilson Joins Trifacta as CEO
- October 2015: Trifacta Wrangler launches
- December 2015: Expands to Europe, Opens London Office
- February 2016: Trifacta raised $35M from existing investors Accel Partners, Greylock Partners, Ignition Partners and new investor Cathay Innovation, bringing the total amount raised to over $76 million.
- November 2016: Recognized by IDC Innovator for Self-Service Data Preparation
- March 2016: Trifacta Introduces Photon Compute Framework
- March 2017: Collaborates with Google to create Google Cloud Dataprep,
- January 2018: Series D Funding $48M from Columbia Pacific, Deutsche Börse, Ericsson, Google, and New York Life
- February 2022: Alteryx announced it completed its acquisition of Trifacta for $400 million in an all-cash deal.

== Products & partnerships ==
Trifacta has three products available via its platform:Trifacta Wrangler, Wrangler Pro, and Trifacta Wrangler Enterprise. Trifacta Wrangler is a connected desktop application to transform data for downstream analytics and visualization. Wrangler Pro supports larger data volumes, cloud and on-premises deployment options, and the ability to schedule and operationalize data preparation workflows. Wrangler Enterprises is an enterprise-level offering for teams in organizations and offers centralized management of security, governance and operationalization.

Trifacta Wrangler Enterprise features include expanded self-service scheduling and flow view, increased sampling flexibility, and context-aware wrangling tasks. Wrangler Pro is designed for analyst teams wrangling diverse data outside of big data environments.

In March 2017, Google announced the launch of Cloud Dataprep, a service for users to clean up their data sets before pushing it into a service like Google's BigQuery managed data warehousing service. The software is an embedded version of Trifacta's Wrangler Enterprise app.

In November 2017, Trifacta announced expanded support for Amazon Web Services (AWS) and made available Wrangler Edge and Wrangler Enterprise on the AWS Marketplace. Trifacta was additionally awarded the AWS Machine Learning (ML) Competency status for previous success in machine learning deployment on AWS.

In March 2018, Trifacta and Microsoft announced their co-sell partner status and the introduction of Trifacta's Wrangler Enterprise product on the Azure Marketplace.
