= HPCC (disambiguation) =

The HPCC is a short form of high performance computer cluster.

HPCC may also refer to:

- Haryana Pradesh Congress Committee
- Himachal Pradesh Congress Committee
