= University of California, Institute for Prediction Technology =

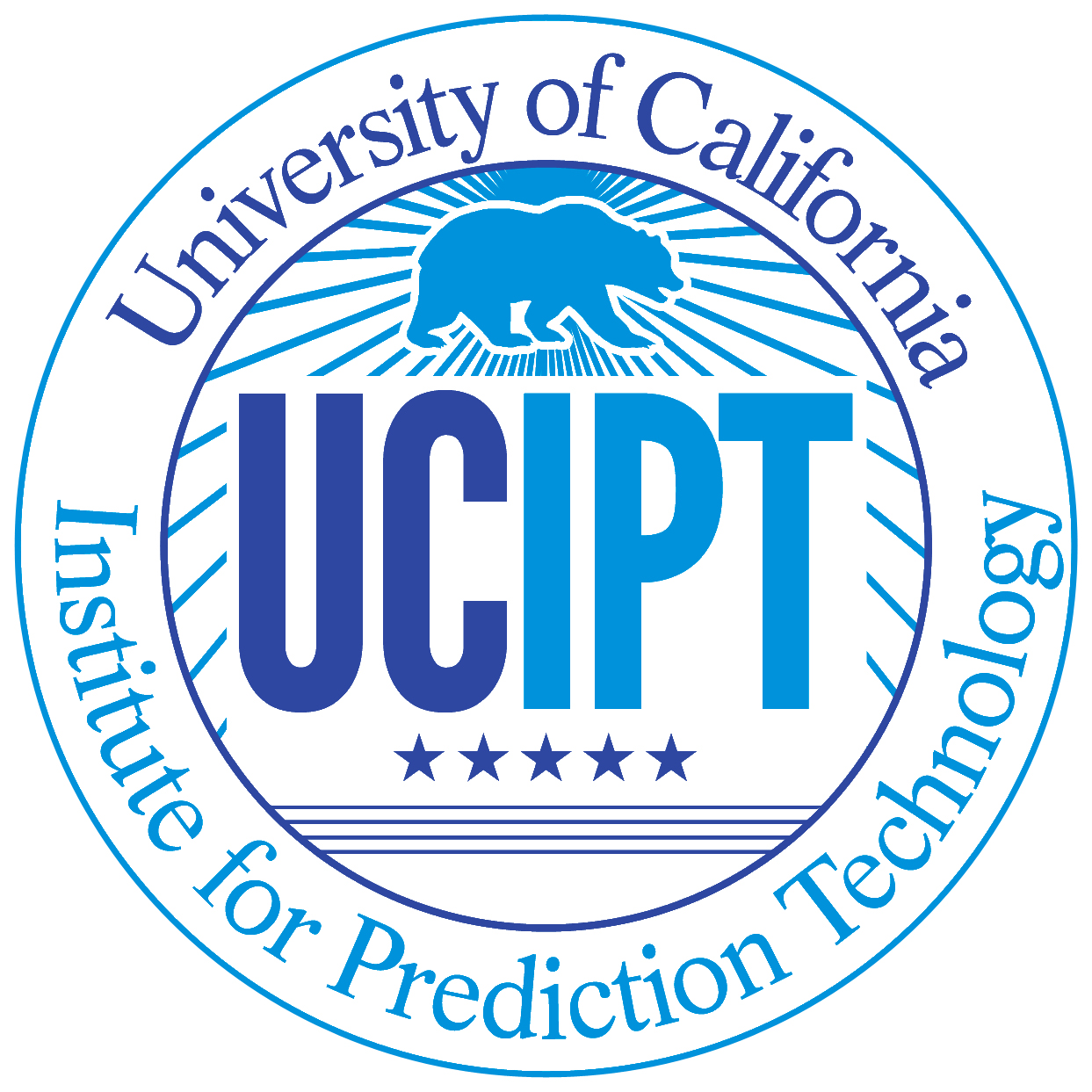
- Type: Research institute
- Established: 2015
- Director: Sean Young, PhD
- Location: Los Angeles, California
- Website: http://predictiontechnology.ucla.edu/

The University of California, Institute for Prediction Technology (UCIPT) is a multidisciplinary organization seeking to accelerate technological research and innovations to predict human behavior and real-world events.

== History ==
Groundwork for UCIPT began in 2013 with a partnership with the UCLA Center for Digital Behavior. In 2014, research results from public health studies by the Institute's research team began to appear in newspapers, blogs, and other media outlets. In January 2015, UCIPT was formally established by Sean Young, who serves as its executive director. Initial funding for the organization was provided by a University of California (UC) President's Research Catalyst Award.

UCIPT has research leaders at four university campuses: UCLA, UC San Diego, UC Santa Cruz, and UC Irvine; UCLA is the hosting institution.

== Mission ==
Technologies such as social media, wearable devices, and online search engines continuously generate large volumes of public data (social “big data”). UCIPT develops tools to analyze these data to inform public and private sector efforts to solve real-world problems. Areas of focus include public health, finance, cybersecurity, consumer products, politics, and poverty. As of 2016, the primary work of the Institute has progressed in the field of public health, particularly in HIV prevention and detection.

== Research approach ==
1. Big data infrastructure

UCIPT is developing a new open-source platform for ingesting, storing, indexing, querying, and analyzing vast quantities of data. Projects combine ideas from three areas (semi-structured data, parallel databases, and data-intensive computing) in order to create an open-source platform that scales by running on large, shared-nothing commodity computing clusters. An example of work in this area is AsterixDB, which grew out of a collaborative grant awarded by the National Science Foundation to UC Irvine professor and UCIPT member Michael Carey.

2. Machine learning models

UCIPT is working to optimize machine learning models that can improve the accuracy and speed of supervised and unsupervised learning. Biomedical applications, primarily to uncover hidden patterns and correlations within big data, are also being undertaken by UCIPT researchers.

3. Applications to solve real-world problems

UCIPT researchers have developed platforms to analyze social media data that allow real-time predictions about future events (e.g., crime). James H. Fowler, a member of UCIPT known for his work on social networks and genopolitics, studies predictors of political opinion as well as public health issues. Sean Young has used social media technologies to predict trends in HIV transmission. Other studies generated by UCIPT focusing on the well-being of transgender persons, wearable technology, and substance use are ongoing.
