= Metadatabase =

Metadatabase is a database model for (1) metadata management, (2) global query of independent databases, and (3) distributed data processing. The word metadatabase is an addition to the dictionary. Originally, metadata was only a common term referring simply to "data about data", such as tags, keywords, and markup headers. However, in this technology, the concept of metadata is extended to also include such data and knowledge representation as information models (e.g., relations, entities-relationships, and objects), application logic (e.g., production rules), and analytic models (e.g., simulation, optimization, and mathematical algorithms). In the case of analytic models, it is also referred to as a Modelbase.

These classes of metadata are integrated with some modeling ontology to give rise to a stable set of meta-relations (tables of metadata). Individual models are interpreted as metadata and entered into these tables. As such, models are inserted, retrieved, updated, and deleted in the same manner as ordinary data do in an ordinary (relational) database. Users will also formulate global queries and requests for processing of local databases through the Metadatabase, using the globally integrated metadata. The Metadatabase structure can be implemented in any open technology for relational databases.

== Significance ==
The Metadatabase technology is developed at Rensselaer Polytechnic Institute at Troy, New York, by a group of faculty and students (see the references at the end of the article), starting in late 1980s. Its main contribution includes the extension of the concept of metadata and metadata management, and the original approach of designing a database for metadata applications. These conceptual results continue to motivate new research and new applications. At the level of particular design, its openness and scalability is tied to that of the particular ontology proposed: It requires reverse-representation of the application models in order to save them into the meta-relations. In theory, the ontology is neutral, and it has been proven in some industrial applications. However, it needs more development to establish it for the field as an open technology. The requirement of reverse-representation is common to any global information integration technology. A way to facilitate it in the Metadatabase approach is to distribute a core portion of it at each local site, to allow for peer-to-peer translation on the fly.
