= Sándor Szalay =

Sándor Szalay may refer to:

- Sándor Szalay (physicist) (1909–1987), Hungarian nuclear physics pioneer
- Sándor Szalay (figure skater) (1893–1965), Hungarian pair skater
