= Sean Young (psychologist) =

Psychologist

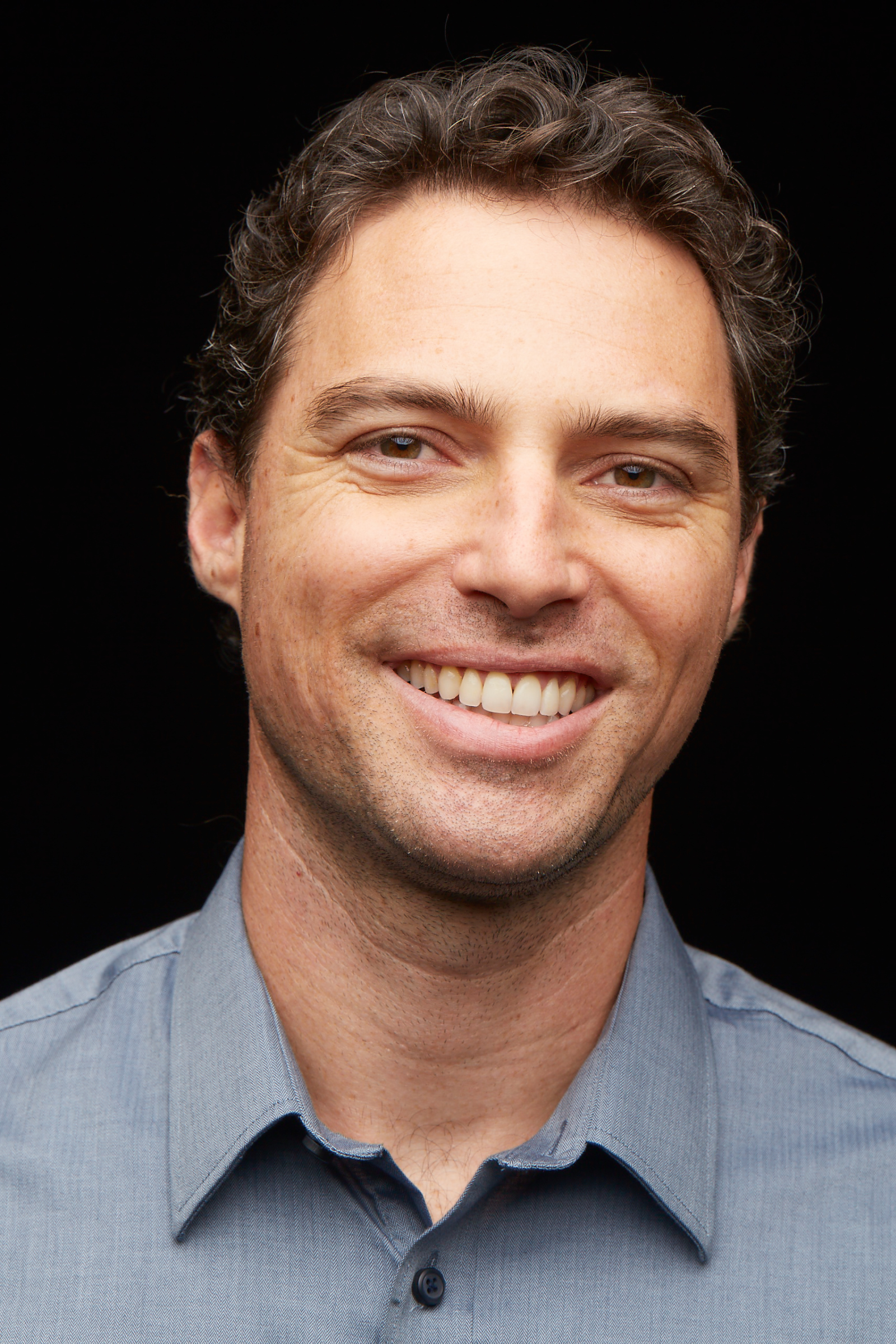
- Born: 1979 (age 46–47)
- Education: University of California, Los Angeles; Stanford University
- Scientific career
- Fields: Psychology, Informatics
- Workplaces: University of California, Los Angeles; University of California, Irvine
- Thesis: Potential moral stigma: Defining, testing, and changing people's willingness to test for sexually transmitted infections. (2008)
- Doctoral advisors: Lee Ross; Benoit Monin

Sean D. Young (born 1979) is an American social and behavioral psychologist. He is a medical school and computer and information sciences professor with the University of California, Irvine (UCI). He serves as the executive director of the University of California, Institute for Prediction Technology (UCIPT) and the UCLA Center for Digital Behavior (CDB). He is a board member for Health and Medicine division for the National Academies of Sciences, Engineering, and Medicine.

== Background ==
Young received his undergraduate degree in ethnomusicology from UCLA, and his master's degree in health services research and PhD in psychology from Stanford University. Prior to joining UCLA as a postdoctoral fellow, Young worked in technology and user behavior/human factors at the NASA Ames Research Center and Cisco Systems. From 2011 to 2019, he was a professor with the UCLA Department of Family Medicine. Since 2019, he has had a split faculty appointment in the Departments of Emergency Medicine and Informatics at UCI. He is currently studying digital health interventions; artificial intelligence, including generative AI; and how music interventions can be used to improve your health.

== Research interests ==
Young's research focuses on the science behind human behavioral change. He is known for work on a range of issues related to technology, including how to implement social media in behavioral change interventions, how social technologies can predict behavior, wearable sensors, and the relationship between online and offline behavior. He has received grants to study how social media and mobile technologies can be used to predict and change behaviors in the areas of health and medicine, consumer behavior, cybersecurity, and crime.

Young has implemented social technologies to address issues related to HIV, drug use prevention, and how to get people to repeat healthy behaviors (e.g., adhere to a medication regimen or exercise routine). As of 2016, he has conducted studies in the United States, Peru, and South Africa, and among homeless youth, undergraduate students, and African American and Latino men who have sex with men.

In addition to his research on social networks, Young has become known for studies of how real-time data can be used to monitor disease and substance use–related behaviors. His work in this area focuses on media-sharing websites designed to evaluate people's activities, intentions, and social interactions. Insight from the resulting body of data ("social big data") is used to understand how people think and act in a variety of situations.

== Scientific leadership ==
Young is the founder and executive director of UCIPT and the UCLA CDB. These two interdisciplinary centers were formed to advance research on the use of digital and mobile technologies to understand, predict, and change human behavior. Findings from studies published by the centers have been cited by a wide range of media outlets. As executive director of UCIPT, Young is partnering with people from multiple academic fields and business sectors, with the goal of scaling software applications to a diverse range of potential uses.

In 2015, Young received the UC President's Research Catalyst Award for a multicampus collaborative project focusing on social big data.

Young created the Harnessing Online Peer Education (HOPE) online intervention, which combines behavior change science and social media. HOPE has been used to help change people's behaviors in the areas of HIV and sexual risk behaviors, general health and fitness, drug use, chronic pain management and opioid addiction, and consumer behavior in business. Studies have shown that people who join HOPE communities are two to three times more likely to change their behavior than people who do not join the communities.

Young is also a speaker, teacher, and author of Stick with It: A Scientifically Proven Process for Changing Your Life for Good, the number-one Wall Street Journal best-selling book. He has presented his work at fora such as the European Parliament, mHealth Conference, and World Congress, as well as to corporations and nonprofit organizations. He teaches a rotating course in global health to UCI undergraduate students and has served as a course instructor at UCLA and Stanford.

== Personal ==
Young was raised in Corona Del Mar and went to Corona Del Mar High School where he played soccer, volleyball, cross-country, and track. He played bass guitar in bands, and was in the band Genohm. He now lives with his wife and children in Orange County, CA.

Selected publications ==

Use of big data for health and behavioral prediction

- Young, Sean D. (2014). "Behavioral insights on big data: Using social media for predicting biomedical outcomes". Trends in Microbiology. 22 (11): 601–602. doi:10.1016/j.tim.2014.08.004. PMC 4364914. PMID 25438614.
- Young, S. D.; Rivers, C.; Lewis, B. (2014). "Methods of using real-time social media technologies for detection and remote monitoring of HIV outcomes". Preventive Medicine. 63: 112–5. doi:10.1016/j.ypmed.2014.01.024. PMC 4031268. PMID 24513169.

Use of social networking and online communities to improve health behaviors

- Young, Sean D.; Cumberland, William G.; Lee, Sung-Jae; Jaganath, Devan; Szekeres, Greg; Coates, Thomas (2013). "Social Networking Technologies as an Emerging Tool for HIV Prevention". Annals of Internal Medicine. 159 (5): 318–24. doi:10.7326/0003-4819-159-5-201309030-00005. PMC 3879120. PMID 24026317.
- Young, Sean D.; Cumberland, William G.; Nianogo, Roch; Menacho, Luis A.; Galea, Jerome T.; Coates, Thomas (2015). "The HOPE social media intervention for global HIV prevention in Peru: A cluster randomised controlled trial". The Lancet HIV. 2 (1): e27–e32. doi:10.1016/S2352-3018(14)00006-X. PMC 4520433. PMID 26236767.
- Young, S. D.; Holloway, I.; Jaganath, D.; Rice, E.; Westmoreland, D.; Coates, T. (2014). "Project HOPE: Online social network changes in an HIV prevention randomized controlled trial for African American and Latino men who have sex with men". American Journal of Public Health (Submitted manuscript). 104 (9): 1707–12. doi:10.2105/AJPH.2014.301992. PMC 4151951. PMID 25033137.
- Young, S. D. (2012). "Recommended guidelines on using social networking technologies for HIV prevention research". AIDS and Behavior. 16 (7): 1743–5. doi:10.1007/s10461-012-0251-9. PMC 3459230. PMID 22821067.

Global health studies

- Young, S. D.; Konda, K.; Caceres, C.; Galea, J.; Sung-Jae, L.; Salazar, X.; Coates, T. (2011). "Effect of a community popular opinion leader HIV/STI intervention on stigma in urban, coastal Peru". AIDS and Behavior. 15 (5): 930–7. doi:10.1007/s10461-010-9826-5. PMC 3110996. PMID 20953691.
- Young, S. D.; Shakiba, A.; Kwok, J.; Montazeri, M. S. (2014). "The influence of social networking technologies on female religious veil-wearing behavior in Iran". Cyberpsychology, Behavior and Social Networking. 17 (5): 317–21. doi:10.1089/cyber.2013.0338. PMC 4012633. PMID 24611768.

General behavior change, health, and social media studies

- Young, S. D.; Jordan, A. H. (2013). "The influence of social networking photos on social norms and sexual health behaviors". Cyberpsychology, Behavior and Social Networking. 16 (4): 243–7. doi:10.1089/cyber.2012.0080. PMC 3624629. PMID 23438268.
- Young, S. D.; Nussbaum, A. D.; Monin, B. (2007). "Potential moral stigma and reactions to sexually transmitted diseases: Evidence for a disjunction fallacy". Personality & Social Psychology Bulletin. 33 (6): 789–99. doi:10.1177/0146167207301027. PMID 17488871. S2CID 28256981.
- Young, S.; Dutta, D.; Dommety, G. (2009). "Extrapolating psychological insights from Facebook profiles: A study of religion and relationship status". Cyberpsychology & Behavior. 12 (3): 347–50. doi:10.1089/cpb.2008.0165. PMID 19366321.

Guidelines for how to use technologies in healthcare and for behavior change

- Young, S. D. (2011). "Recommendations for Using Online Social Networking Technologies to Reduce Inaccurate Online Health Information". Online Journal of Health and Allied Sciences. 10 (2). PMC 3196338. PMID 22016578.
- Young, S. D. (2012). "Recommended guidelines on using social networking technologies for HIV prevention research". AIDS and Behavior. 16 (7): 1743–5. doi:10.1007/s10461-012-0251-9. PMC 3459230. PMID 22821067.

Community-based participatory research

- Young, Sean D.; Klausner, Jeffrey; Fynn, Risa; Bolan, Robert (2014). "Electronic vending machines for dispensing rapid HIV self-testing kits: A case study". AIDS Care. 26 (2): 267–269. doi:10.1080/09540121.2013.808732. PMC 3917319. PMID 23777528.
- Young, Sean D.; Oppenheimer, Daniel M. (2006). "Different methods of presenting risk information and their influence on medication compliance intentions: Results of three studies". Clinical Therapeutics. 28 (1): 129–139. doi:10.1016/j.clinthera.2006.01.013. PMID 16490587.

== Appointments ==
- Professor, UCI Department of Emergency Medicine
- Associate Professor, UCLA Department of Family Medicine
- Executive Director, University of California, Institute for Prediction Technology
- Executive Director, UCLA Center for Digital Behavior
- Member of the following professional societies:
  - International AIDS Society
  - Society of Personality and Social Psychology
  - Silicon Beach: Society of Los Angeles–based technology developers
  - Society for Judgment and Decision Making
  - European Health Psychology Society
  - European Federation of IASP Chapters
  - NASA Ames Research Center
  - Healthcare Information and Management Systems Society

== Awards ==
- Stick with It: #1 Wall Street Journal Bestselling Book
- Ruth L. Kirschstein National Research Service Award
- Stanford University Social E-challenge Competition Winner
- Best Paper award at IEEE Virtual Reality
- Network for AIDS Research in Los Angeles (NARLA) Seed Grant, Principal Investigator
- UCLA AIDS Institute HIV Prevention Seed Grant
- UCLA CHIPTS Award for HIV prevention with innovative mobile technologies
- NIMH K01: Using online social networks for HIV prevention in African-American and Latino MSM
- UCLA Health System Appreciation Award for Excellence
- mHealth Training Award
- Fordham Ethics Award in HIV prevention
