= Randal Burns =

American computer scientist

- Citizenship: United States
- Occupation: Computer Scientist
- Title: Professor

Academic background
- Education: University of California, Santa Cruz; Stanford University
- Thesis: Data Management in a Distributed File System for Storage Area Networks (2000)
- Doctoral advisor: Darrell Long
- Website: randalburns.github.io

Randal Chilton Burns is a professor and Chair of the computer science department at Johns Hopkins University. He is a member of the Kavli Neuroscience Discovery Institute, Institute for Data-Intensive Science, Engineering and the Science of Learning Institute. His research interests lie in building scalable data systems for exploration and analysis of big data.

== Education and early career ==
Burns graduated from Stanford University in 1993 with a bachelor's degree in geophysics. He earned his master's and doctorate from University of California, Santa Cruz, in 1997 and 2000 respectively. He also worked as a research staff member at IBM's Alamden Research Center between 1996 and 2002.

== Research ==
Burns's PhD dissertation is titled 'Data Management in a Distributed File System for Storage Area Networks'. He has worked on waste management of unused digital data. He was part of a team along with Alex Szalay and Charles Meneveau which built a 350TB turbulence database that provides access to large computational fluid dynamics simulations. In recent times, his research has focused on neuroscience where he built a cloud based web-service for neuroscience data and enabled better understanding of the human brain.
