= Panta Rhei (band) =

- Also known as: P.R. Computer
- Origin: Debrecen, Hungary
- Genres: Symphonic rock, progressive rock, jazz rock, electronic
- Years active: 1974–1982, 2017–
- Members: Enikő Ács; András Kálmán; Mátyás Milkovics; András Szalay; Dániel Szalay; Alex (Sándor) Szalay
- Past members: József Nagy; Kálmán Matolcsy; Alex (Sándor) Szalay; András Szalay; Csaba Béke; Gyula Moldován; Miklós Kiss; Enikő Ács; András Laár; András Schmitt

Panta Rhei were a Hungarian rock band, known for their progressive rock recordings and adaptations of classical music, for which they created synthesizers, such as the Muzix81 system. The band name refers to the philosophy of Heraclitus.

== History ==
Panta Rhei formed in Hungary in 1974, consisting of Kálmán Matolcsy who played keyboards and synthesizers, Alex Szalay on guitar, András Szalay on bass and Csaba Béke on drums. They designed and built their own kinds of synthesizers.

Between 1974 and 1982 they played various styles of music ranging from jazz to progressive rock. In 1976 Miklós Kiss briefly joined the group, and contributed to a track for the Bartók album. Also in 1976 Enikő Ács joined the band as a vocalist and Csaba Béke returned on drums, contributing to the other tracks of the Bartók album recorded between 1975–1977. However, this album with adaptations of Béla Bartók's works was never released due to objections by the Bartók family. The recordings were supposed to be released again on the Epilogus 2 CD version twenty years later, but the Bartók family objected again, so the CD was reduced to a single, and the unpublished material is only available on the web .

By 1980 Panta Rhei released their first album titled Panta Rhei, having a sound different from the jazz rock and classical adaptations of the rock days of the band, with a more progressive rock / pop rock crossover sound. By then, Enikő Ács and Csaba Béke had left and were replaced by András Laár on guitar and vocals and András Schmitt on drums. Both Schmitt and Laár remained in Panta Rhei until 1981, assuming drummer Béke would return. In 1982 the band performed their last concert and the band also broke up in 1982, returning to their familiar Symphonic Prog Rock sound.

In 1981 singer and guitarist András Laár would go on to form the Hungarian new wave and pop rock band KFT.

After Panta Rhei ended in 1982, in 1983 they continued recording under the banner of "P.R. Computer" and released an album of the same name which sold over 80,000 copies and established their noticeable work. The album was recorded with entirely electronic music, using the latest custom built synthesizers and computers, hence the new name "P.R. Computer". P.R. can be read as progressive rock or Panta Rhei, P.R. Computer was active up until 1989.

In 2017 Panta Rhei returned to the stage and tours again.

== Influences ==
Panta Rhei sold records in Eastern Europe and the Soviet Union and were known for their classical adaptations of Béla Bartók's and Edvard Grieg's works.

Panta Rhei were influenced by progressive rock bands Emerson, Lake & Palmer, The Nice, King Crimson, and others. ELP influences are blatantly heard in their early works, especially on the unreleased Bartók album recorded in 1977, as the music is driven by Hammond organ, drums and bass in the same way ELP presented their music; also synths were a main part of Panta Rhei's music.

== Recordings ==
During their recording career Panta Rhei issued 2 LPs, 6 singles and recordings for film and ballet. Their albums sold over 100,000 copies in Hungary and Eastern Europe, whilst the band was mainly amateur they managed to record and release a few material in their entire lifespan.

A compilation CD called Epilógus (English: "Epilogue") of previously unpublished material was released in 1998, featuring three fusion pieces from 1977 and a 22-minute prog rock epic, Peer Gynt Suite recorded in 1976 and, ennobled to a must-hear for progressive rock fans, Epilógus features electronic music from 1983 until the latter 80s under the "P.R. Computer" banner. 2002 saw a release of a book about the band that included a CD with a collection of songs recorded 1975–79.

== Members ==
Panta Rhei - line up changes 1974–1982
Kálmán Matolcsy / keyboards (1974–1982)

Sándor (Alex) Szalay / guitar (1974–1982)
András Szalay / vocals and bass (1974–1982)
Csaba Béke / drums (1974–1982)
Gyula Moldován /guitar and vocals (1974–1975)
Ács Enikő / vocals (1976–1979)
Kegye János / saxophone (1976)
Miklós Kiss / drums (1976)
Laár András / guitar and vocals (1980–1981)
Nagy József / flute (1974–1975)
Schmidt András / drums (1980–1981)

Panta Rhei - reunion
Sándor (Alex) Szalay / guitar

András Szalay / vocals and bass
Mátyás Milkovics / synthesizer
Dániel Szalay / drums
András Kálmán / keyboards
Enikő Ács / vocals

=== After Panta Rhei ===
Alex Szalay is now working as a Bloomberg Distinguished Professor of Physics & Astronomy and Computer Science at the Johns Hopkins University, USA.

Panta Rhei's organ virtuoso and synthesizer wizard Kálmán Matolcsy died on 5 September 2005, (born in 1953) leaving two sons and a wife behind, (his death has been confirmed as a programme was dedicated to him and the band on Hungarian Radio in October 2005).

Andras Szalay designed three generations of guitar synthesizers: Shadow GTM-6 and SH-075 in 1986–87; Axon series in 1993–97; and recently the wireless Fishman Triple Play in 2005–12. Other electronic music instruments that he designed are the Wersi Electronic Grand Piano; the AKAI DuoBuddy and DecaBuddy Vocal Harmonizers; the AKAI EWI 4000s and EWIUSB Electronic Wind Instruments; the Fishman Aura acoustic guitar simulator.

Csaba Béke lives in Germany as a music teacher.

== Discography ==
- Társak között / Talán (SP Record, 1978)
- Itt van a délután / Mandarin (SP Record, 1979)
- Panta Rhei (studio album, 1980)
- PR Computer (studio album, 1983)
- Epilógus (compilation, 1997)
- Panta Rhei 1975–79 (compilation, 2002)
- Blue Light2 (Tropical Fever on a compilation published by Cosmic Sounds, London, 2005)

and a couple of other songs on various compilations

=== Unreleased recordings ===
Until now Panta Rhei have never released these recording until the official site uploaded the recordings:

- Bartók (Studio/Live, 1977) (unreleased album)
- Pop Songs (Misc Recordings 1975–79) (compilation, 1979)
- Misc Live Recordings (1975–82)
- Film Music (1976–89)
- Demo Recordings (1983)
