= Darrell Long =

American computer scientist

Darrell Don Earl Long
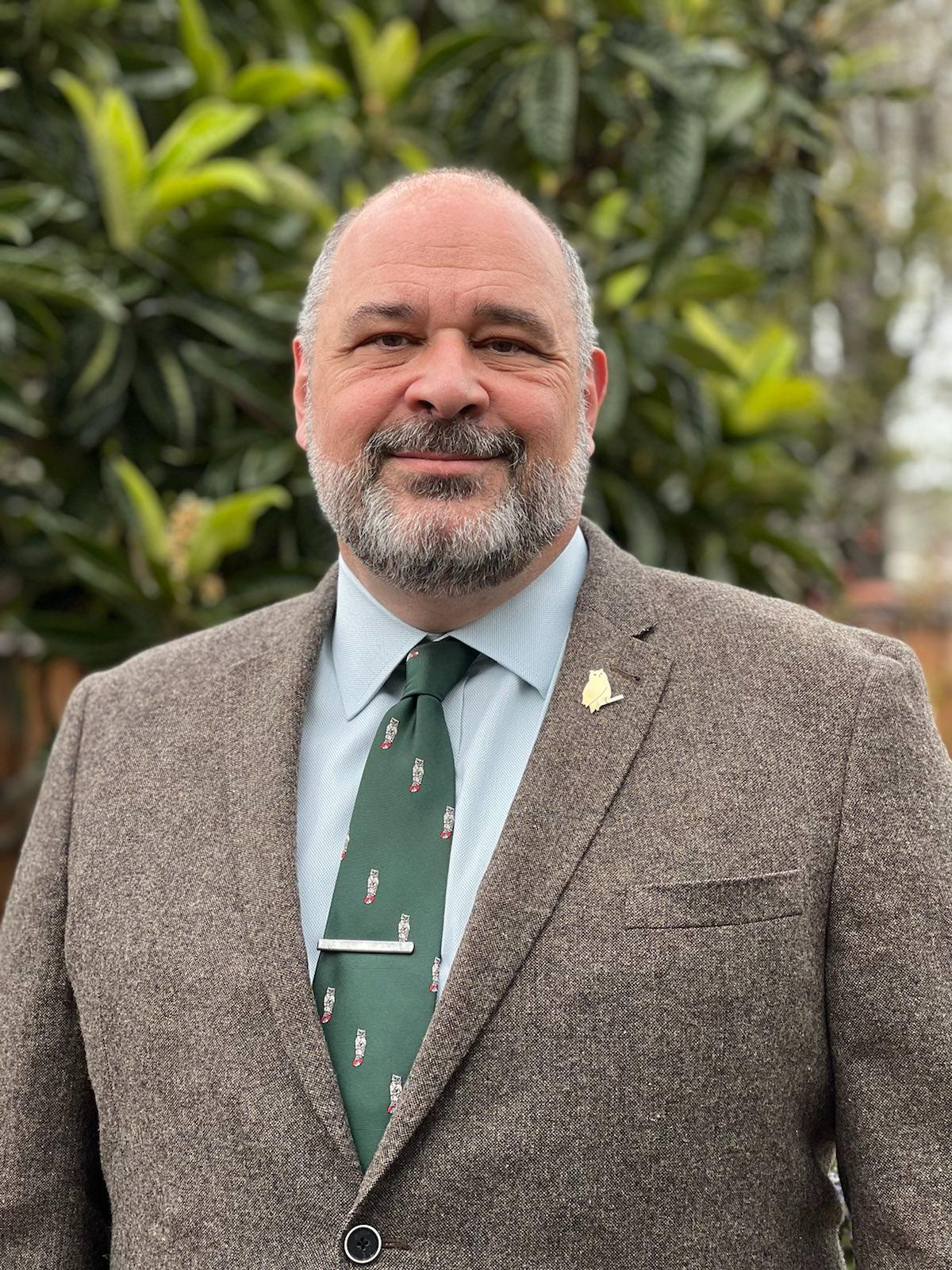
- Education: San Diego State University (B.S. 1984); University of California, San Diego (M.S. 1986), (Ph.D. 1988)
- Known for: Computer Data Storage
- Spouses: Mary Long (m. 1984; died 2014) Elaine Long (m. 2016)
- Awards: IEEE Fellow (2006); AAAS Fellow (2008)
- Scientific career
- Fields: Computer Science; Computer Engineering
- Workplaces: University of California, Santa Cruz; Université Paris–Dauphine; Conservatoire National des Arts et Métiers; Université Paris–Descartes
- Doctoral advisor: Jehan-François Pâris
- Doctoral students: Randal Burns

Darrell Don Earl Long is an American computer scientist and computer engineer who is the inaugural holder of the Kumar Malavalli Endowed Chair of Storage Systems Research and Distinguished Professor Emeritus of Engineering at the University of California, Santa Cruz. He was editor-in-chief of the IEEE Letters of the Computer Society and was editor-in-chief of the ACM Transactions on Storage (TOS). In 2002, he was the founder of the Conference on File and Storage Technologies (FAST).

== Biography ==
Long did his undergraduate studies at San Diego State University, graduating in 1984, and went on to graduate studies at the University of California, San Diego, earning a Ph.D. in 1988 under the supervision of Jehan-François Pâris.

While in graduate school, he worked as a lecturer in mathematics at San Diego State University and in computer science at the University of California, San Diego. After earning his Ph.D. he joined the faculty of the University of California, Santa Cruz. At UCSC, he has been associate dean for research and graduate studies in the Jack Baskin School of Engineering, and he is Director emeritus of the Storage Systems Research Center. During his tenure at the SSRC, seven women earned Ph.D's in the program, which is noteworthy in the field of Computer Science, where women are significantly underrepresented.

Long has held visiting faculty positions at the Université Paris–Dauphine (Paris IX), the Conservatoire National des Arts et Métiers, the Université Paris–Descartes (Paris V), Sorbonne Université (Pierre et Marie Curie, Paris VI), the University of Technology, Sydney, the Center for Communications Research, the United States Naval Postgraduate School and is Professor ad Honorem de la Universidad Católica del Uruguay. He is an Associate Member of the European Organization for Nuclear Research (CERN).

Long served as the Vice-Chair and then Chair of the University of California Committee on Research Policy. He has served on the University of California President’s Council on the National Laboratories, and on the Science & Technology, National Security and Intelligence committees for those laboratories. He served for many years on the National Research Council's Standing Committee on Technology Insight-Gauge, Evaluate, and Review (TIGER), and the Committee on Defense Intelligence Agency Technology Forecasts and Reviews. He served on the National Research Council's Committee on Science and Technology for Defense Warning. He was a member of the United States Army Laboratory Assessment Group (ALAG) and the United States Army Technology Objectives review panel. He is a member of the Intelligence Science and Technology Experts Group (ISTEG) for the National Academies of Sciences, Engineering and Medicine. He is a member of the advisory group JASON.

== Research ==
Long's research interests include computer data storage, operating systems, distributed computing, and computer security. In 1991, Long worked on the idea of storing metadata separately from data in the Swift file system. This idea became a central design concept in subsequent distributed file and storage systems, including two projects on which Long was a major contributor: IBM TotalStorage/SAN (Storage Tank) and Ceph. The Ceph distributed file system was first designed and implemented in the Storage Systems Research Center in 2006 by Sage Weil and other members of the SSRC under the direction of Long, Professor Ethan Miller, Professor Scott Brandt, and Dr. Carlos Maltzahn. Long has done further research on metadata for exascale file systems and security for exascale file systems.

Long worked on data deduplication, having worked on deduplication and delta compression for reducing the storage demands for backup and long-term data storage. He also contributed to techniques for scaling deduplication for very large backup systems.

Beyond these areas, Long has written research papers on web caching, power-aware hard disk management in mobile computing, and low-bandwidth multicast techniques for video on demand, among other topics.

== Awards and honors ==
Long became an IEEE Fellow in 2006 "for contributions to storage systems architecture and performance". In 2008 he was inducted as a fellow of the American Association for the Advancement of Science.

== Philanthropy ==
In 2022, Darrell Long and his wife Elaine established the Darrell and Elaine Long Endowment to promote excellence in the physical sciences and engineering. The endowment supported two annual awards—the Long Prize in Experimental Engineering and the Long Prize in Experimental Physics—given beginning in 2022 for the most outstanding doctoral dissertations in each field. In June 2025, the endowment was expanded to create the Long Family Professorship in Experimental Physics. The inaugural chairholder was Bruce A. Schumm, Distinguished Professor of Physics.
