= Data-intensive computing =

Class of parallel computing applications

Data-intensive computing is a class of parallel computing applications which use a data parallel approach to process large volumes of data typically terabytes or petabytes in size and typically referred to as big data. Computing applications that devote most of their execution time to computational requirements are deemed compute-intensive, whereas applications are deemed data-intensive if they require large volumes of data and devote most of their processing time to input/output and manipulation of data.

== Introduction ==
The rapid growth of the Internet and World Wide Web led to vast amounts of information available online. In addition, business and government organizations create large amounts of both structured and unstructured information, which need to be processed, analyzed, and linked. Vinton Cerf described this as an “information avalanche” and stated, “we must harness the Internet’s energy before the information it has unleashed buries us”. An IDC white paper sponsored by EMC Corporation estimated the amount of information currently stored in a digital form in 2007 at 281 exabytes and the overall compound growth rate at 57% with information in organizations growing at even a faster rate. In a 2003 study of the so-called information explosion it was estimated that 95% of all current information exists in unstructured form with increased data processing requirements compared to structured information. The storing, managing, accessing, and processing of this vast amount of data represents a fundamental need and an immense challenge in order to satisfy needs to search, analyze, mine, and visualize this data as information. Data-intensive computing is intended to address this need.

Parallel processing approaches can be generally classified as either compute-intensive, or data-intensive. Compute-intensive is used to describe application programs that are compute-bound. Such applications devote most of their execution time to computational requirements as opposed to I/O, and typically require small volumes of data. Parallel processing of compute-intensive applications typically involves parallelizing individual algorithms within an application process, and decomposing the overall application process into separate tasks, which can then be executed in parallel on an appropriate computing platform to achieve overall higher performance than serial processing. In compute-intensive applications, multiple operations are performed simultaneously, with each operation addressing a particular part of the problem. This is often referred to as task parallelism.

Data-intensive is used to describe applications that are I/O bound or with a need to process large volumes of data. Such applications devote most of their processing time to I/O and movement and manipulation of data. Parallel processing of data-intensive applications typically involves partitioning or subdividing the data into multiple segments which can be processed independently using the same executable application program in parallel on an appropriate computing platform, then reassembling the results to produce the completed output data. The greater the aggregate distribution of the data, the more benefit there is in parallel processing of the data. Data-intensive processing requirements normally scale linearly according to the size of the data and are very amenable to straightforward parallelization. The fundamental challenges for data-intensive computing are managing and processing exponentially growing data volumes, significantly reducing associated data analysis cycles to support practical, timely applications, and developing new algorithms which can scale to search and process massive amounts of data. Researchers coined the term BORPS for "billions of records per second" to measure record processing speed in a way analogous to how the term MIPS applies to describe computers' processing speed.

== Data-parallelism ==
Computer system architectures which can support data parallel applications were promoted in the early 2000s for large-scale data processing requirements of data-intensive computing. Data-parallelism applied computation independently to each data item of a set of data, which allows the degree of parallelism to be scaled with the volume of data. The most important reason for developing data-parallel applications is the potential for scalable performance, and may result in several orders of magnitude performance improvement. The key issues with developing applications using data-parallelism are the choice of the algorithm, the strategy for data decomposition, load balancing on processing nodes, message passing communications between nodes, and the overall accuracy of the results. The development of a data parallel application can involve substantial programming complexity to define the problem in the context of available programming tools, and to address limitations of the target architecture. Information extraction from and indexing of Web documents is typical of data-intensive computing which can derive significant performance benefits from data parallel implementations since Web and other types of document collections can typically then be processed in parallel.

The US National Science Foundation (NSF) funded a research program from 2009 through 2010. Areas of focus were:

- Approaches to parallel programming to address the parallel processing of data on data-intensive systems
- Programming abstractions including models, languages, and algorithms which allow a natural expression of parallel processing of data
- Design of data-intensive computing platforms to provide high levels of reliability, efficiency, availability, and scalability.
- Identifying applications that can exploit this computing paradigm and determining how it should evolve to support emerging data-intensive applications

Pacific Northwest National Labs defined data-intensive computing as “capturing, managing, analyzing, and understanding data at volumes and rates that push the frontiers of current technologies”.

== Approach ==
Data-intensive computing platforms typically use a parallel computing approach combining multiple processors and disks in large commodity computing clusters connected using high-speed communications switches and networks which allows the data to be partitioned among the available computing resources and processed independently to achieve performance and scalability based on the amount of data. A cluster can be defined as a type of parallel and distributed system, which consists of a collection of inter-connected stand-alone computers working together as a single integrated computing resource. This approach to parallel processing is often referred to as a “shared nothing” approach since each node consisting of processor, local memory, and disk resources shares nothing with other nodes in the cluster. In parallel computing this approach is considered suitable for data-intensive computing and problems which are “embarrassingly parallel”, i.e. where it is relatively easy to separate the problem into a number of parallel tasks and there is no dependency or communication required between the tasks other than overall management of the tasks. These types of data processing problems are inherently adaptable to various forms of distributed computing including clusters, data grids, and cloud computing.

== Characteristics ==
Several common characteristics of data-intensive computing systems distinguish them from other forms of computing:

1. The principle of collection of the data and programs or algorithms is used to perform the computation. To achieve high performance in data-intensive computing, it is important to minimize the movement of data. This characteristic allows processing algorithms to execute on the nodes where the data resides reducing system overhead and increasing performance. Newer technologies such as InfiniBand allow data to be stored in a separate repository and provide performance comparable to collocated data.
2. The programming model utilized. Data-intensive computing systems utilize a machine-independent approach in which applications are expressed in terms of high-level operations on data, and the runtime system transparently controls the scheduling, execution, load balancing, communications, and movement of programs and data across the distributed computing cluster. The programming abstraction and language tools allow the processing to be expressed in terms of data flows and transformations incorporating new dataflow programming languages and shared libraries of common data manipulation algorithms such as sorting.
3. A focus on reliability and availability. Large-scale systems with hundreds or thousands of processing nodes are inherently more susceptible to hardware failures, communications errors, and software bugs. Data-intensive computing systems are designed to be fault resilient. This typically includes redundant copies of all data files on disk, storage of intermediate processing results on disk, automatic detection of node or processing failures, and selective re-computation of results.
4. The inherent scalability of the underlying hardware and software architecture. Data-intensive computing systems can typically be scaled in a linear fashion to accommodate virtually any amount of data, or to meet time-critical performance requirements by simply adding additional processing nodes. The number of nodes and processing tasks assigned for a specific application can be variable or fixed depending on the hardware, software, communications, and distributed file system architecture.

== System architectures ==
A variety of system architectures have been implemented for data-intensive computing and large-scale data analysis applications including parallel and distributed relational database management systems which have been available to run on shared nothing clusters of processing nodes for more than two decades. However, most data growth is with data in unstructured form and new processing paradigms with more flexible data models were needed. Several solutions have emerged including the MapReduce architecture pioneered by Google and now available in an open-source implementation called Hadoop used by Yahoo, Facebook, and others. LexisNexis Risk Solutions also developed and implemented a scalable platform for data-intensive computing which is used by LexisNexis.

=== MapReduce ===
The MapReduce architecture and programming model pioneered by Google is an example of a modern systems architecture designed for data-intensive computing. The MapReduce architecture allows programmers to use a functional programming style to create a map function that processes a key–value pair associated with the input data to generate a set of intermediate key–value pairs, and a reduce function that merges all intermediate values associated with the same intermediate key. Since the system automatically takes care of details like partitioning the input data, scheduling and executing tasks across a processing cluster, and managing the communications between nodes, programmers with no experience in parallel programming can easily use a large distributed processing environment.

The programming model for MapReduce architecture is a simple abstraction where the computation takes a set of input key–value pairs associated with the input data and produces a set of output key–value pairs. In the Map phase, the input data is partitioned into input splits and assigned to Map tasks associated with processing nodes in the cluster. The Map task typically executes on the same node containing its assigned partition of data in the cluster. These Map tasks perform user-specified computations on each input key–value pair from the partition of input data assigned to the task, and generates a set of intermediate results for each key. The shuffle and sort phase then takes the intermediate data generated by each Map task, sorts this data with intermediate data from other nodes, divides this data into regions to be processed by the reduce tasks, and distributes this data as needed to nodes where the Reduce tasks will execute. The Reduce tasks perform additional user-specified operations on the intermediate data possibly merging values associated with a key to a smaller set of values to produce the output data. For more complex data processing procedures, multiple MapReduce calls may be linked together in sequence.

=== Hadoop ===
Apache Hadoop is an open source software project sponsored by The Apache Software Foundation which implements the MapReduce architecture. Hadoop now encompasses multiple subprojects in addition to the base core, MapReduce, and HDFS distributed filesystem. These additional subprojects provide enhanced application processing capabilities to the base Hadoop implementation and currently include Avro, Pig, HBase, ZooKeeper, Hive, and Chukwa. The Hadoop MapReduce architecture is functionally similar to the Google implementation except that the base programming language for Hadoop is Java instead of C++. The implementation is intended to execute on clusters of commodity processors.

Hadoop implements a distributed data processing scheduling and execution environment and framework for MapReduce jobs. Hadoop includes a distributed file system called HDFS which is analogous to GFS in the Google MapReduce implementation. The Hadoop execution environment supports additional distributed data processing capabilities which are designed to run using the Hadoop MapReduce architecture. These include HBase, a distributed column-oriented database which provides random access read/write capabilities; Hive, which is a data warehouse system built on top of Hadoop that provides SQL-like query capabilities for data summarization, ad hoc queries, and analysis of large datasets; and Pig – a high-level data-flow programming language and execution framework for data-intensive computing.

Pig was developed at Yahoo! to provide a specific language notation for data analysis applications and to improve programmer productivity and reduce development cycles when using the Hadoop MapReduce environment. Pig programs are automatically translated into sequences of MapReduce programs if needed in the execution environment. Pig provides capabilities in the language for loading, storing, filtering, grouping, de-duplication, ordering, sorting, aggregation, and joining operations on the data.

=== HPCC ===
HPCC (High-Performance Computing Cluster) was developed and implemented by LexisNexis Risk Solutions. The development of this computing platform began in 1999 and applications were in production by late 2000. The HPCC approach also utilizes commodity clusters of hardware running the Linux operating system. Custom system software and middleware components were developed and layered on the base Linux operating system to provide the execution environment and distributed filesystem support required for data-intensive computing. LexisNexis also implemented a new high-level language for data-intensive computing.

The ECL programming language is a high-level, declarative, data-centric, implicitly parallel language that allows the programmer to define what the data processing result should be and the dataflows and transformations that are necessary to achieve the result. The ECL language includes extensive capabilities for data definition, filtering, data management, and data transformation, and provides an extensive set of built-in functions to operate on records in datasets which can include user-defined transformation functions. ECL programs are compiled into optimized C++ source code, which is subsequently compiled into executable code and distributed to the nodes of a processing cluster.

To address both batch and online aspects data-intensive computing applications, HPCC includes two distinct cluster environments, each of which can be optimized independently for its parallel data processing purpose. The Thor platform is a cluster whose purpose is to be a data refinery for processing massive volumes of raw data for applications such as data cleansing and hygiene, extract, transform, load (ETL), record linking and entity resolution, large-scale ad hoc analysis of data, and creation of key data and indexes to support high-performance structured queries and data warehouse applications. A Thor system is similar to the Hadoop MapReduce platform in its hardware configuration, function, execution environment, filesystem, and capabilities but provides higher performance in equivalent configurations. The Roxie platform provides an online high-performance structured query and analysis system or data warehouse delivering the parallel data access processing requirements of online applications through Web services interfaces supporting thousands of simultaneous queries and users with sub-second response times. A Roxie system is similar in its function and capabilities to Hadoop with HBase and Hive capabilities added, but provides an optimized execution environment and filesystem for high-performance online processing. Both Thor and Roxie systems utilize the same ECL programming language for implementing applications, increasing programmer productivity.

== See also ==
- Implicit parallelism
- Massively parallel
- Supercomputer
- Graph500
