= Sándor Szalay (physicist) =

Hungarian nuclear physicist

Sándor Szalay, Sr. (4 October 1909 – 11 October 1987) was a pioneer of Hungarian nuclear physics.

He discovered a natural mechanism for uranium enrichment, which led to the discovery of several uranium deposits including an enriched deposit in the Mecsek Mountains of Hungary. In 1955 he collaborated with Gyula Csikai to discover the neutrino, a weakly interactive particle. In a photograph of a cloud chamber, they found a nucleus changing direction, which they interpreted as the emission of a neutrino. (The antineutrino was detected by Frederick Reines and Clyde Cowan in 1953, a discovery for which Reines was awarded the 1995 Nobel Prize in Physics.) Szalay also founded the Institute of Nuclear Research, a branch of the Hungarian Academy of Sciences. He is considered the father of Hungarian nuclear physics.
