= HPCC =

High-performance computer cluster

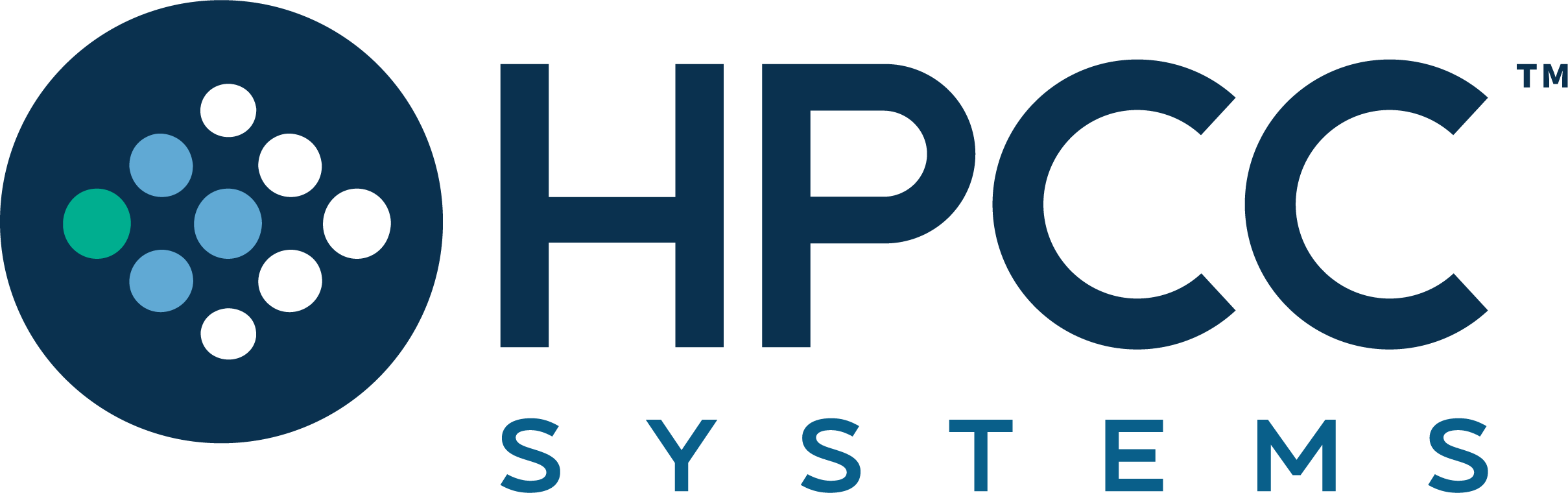
- Developers: HPCC Systems, LexisNexis Risk Solutions
- Release: 15-06-2011
- Stable release: 7.4.18-1 / 13-09-2019
- Written in: C++, ECL
- Operating system: Linux
- License: Apache License 2.0
- Website: hpccsystems.com
- Repository: https://github.com/hpcc-systems

HPCC (High-Performance Computing Cluster), also known as DAS (Data Analytics Supercomputer), is an open source, data-intensive computing system platform developed by LexisNexis Risk Solutions. The HPCC platform incorporates a software architecture implemented on commodity computing clusters to provide high-performance, data-parallel processing for applications utilizing big data. The HPCC platform includes system configurations to support both parallel batch data processing (Thor) and high-performance online query applications using indexed data files (Roxie). The HPCC platform also includes a data-centric declarative programming language for parallel data processing called ECL.

The public release of HPCC was announced in 2011, after ten years of in-house development (according to LexisNexis). It is an alternative to Hadoop and other Big data platforms.

== System architecture ==
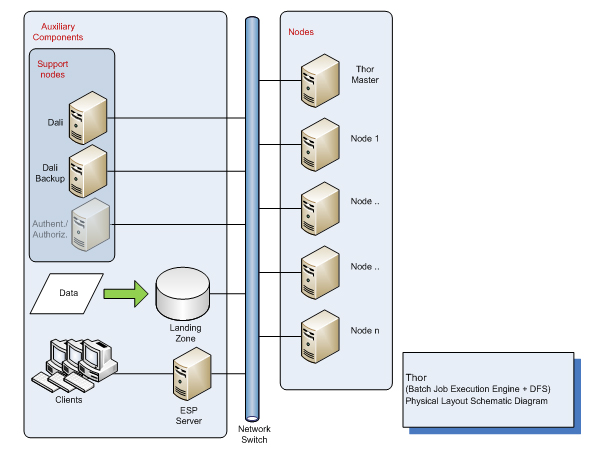
Figure 2. Thor processing cluster

The HPCC system architecture includes two distinct cluster processing environments Thor and Roxie, each of which can be optimized independently for its parallel data processing purpose.

The first of these platforms is called Thor, a data refinery whose overall purpose is the general processing of massive volumes of raw data of any type for any purpose but typically used for data cleansing and hygiene, ETL (extract, transform, load) processing of the raw data, record linking and entity resolution, large-scale ad-hoc complex analytics, and creation of keyed data and indexes to support high-performance structured queries and data warehouse applications. The data refinery name Thor is a reference to the mythical Norse god of thunder with the large hammer symbolic of crushing large amounts of raw data into useful information. A Thor cluster is similar in its function, execution environment, filesystem, and capabilities to the Google and Hadoop MapReduce platforms.

Figure 2 shows a representation of a physical Thor processing cluster which functions as a batch job execution engine for scalable data-intensive computing applications. In addition to the Thor master and slave nodes, additional auxiliary and common components are needed to implement a complete HPCC processing environment.

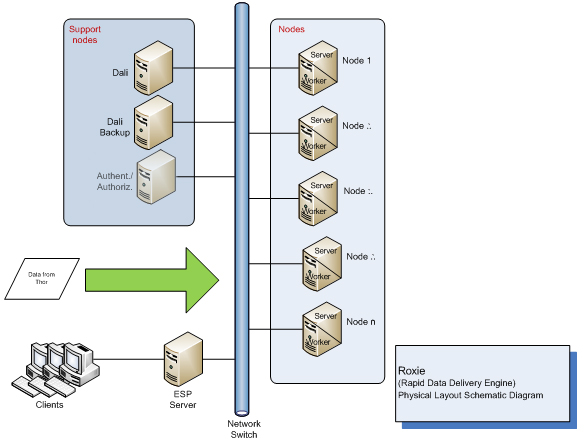
Figure 3. Roxie processing cluster

The second of the parallel data processing platforms is called Roxie and functions as a rapid data delivery engine. This platform is designed as an online high-performance structured query and analysis platform or data warehouse delivering the parallel data access processing requirements of online applications through Web services interfaces supporting thousands of simultaneous queries and users with sub-second response times. Roxie utilizes a distributed indexed filesystem to provide parallel processing of queries using an optimized execution environment and filesystem for high-performance online processing. A Roxie cluster is similar in its function and capabilities to ElasticSearch and Hadoop with HBase and Hive capabilities added, and provides for near real time predictable query latencies. Both Thor and Roxie clusters utilize the ECL programming language for implementing applications, increasing continuity and programmer productivity.

Figure 3 shows a representation of a physical Roxie processing cluster which functions as an online query execution engine for high-performance query and data warehousing applications. A Roxie cluster includes multiple nodes with server and worker processes for processing queries; an additional auxiliary component called an ESP server which provides interfaces for external client access to the cluster; and additional common components which are shared with a Thor cluster in an HPCC environment. Although a Thor processing cluster can be implemented and used without a Roxie cluster, an HPCC environment which includes a Roxie cluster should also include a Thor cluster. The Thor cluster is used to build the distributed index files used by the Roxie cluster and to develop online queries which will be deployed with the index files to the Roxie cluster.

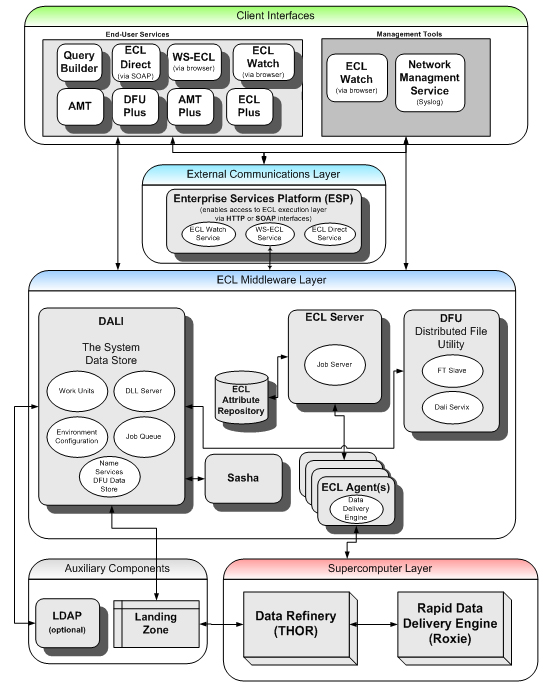
Figure 4. HPCC software architecture

== Software architecture ==
The HPCC software architecture incorporates the Thor and Roxie clusters as well as common middleware components, an external communications layer, client interfaces which provide both end-user services and system management tools, and auxiliary components to support monitoring and to facilitate loading and storing of filesystem data from external sources. Usually a HPCC environment includes only Thor clusters, or both Thor and Roxie clusters, although Roxie occasionally is used to build its own indexes. The overall HPCC software architecture is shown in Figure 4.

== HPCC Systems ==
HPCC Systems (High Performance Computing Cluster) is part of LexisNexis Risk Solutions and was formed to promote and sell the HPCC software. In June 2011, it announced the offering of the software under an open source dual license model.

HPCC Systems offers both a Community Edition and an Enterprise Edition. The Community Edition is free to download, includes the source code and is released under the Apache License 2.0. The Enterprise Edition is available under a paid commercial license and includes training, support, indemnification and additional modules. In November 2011, HPCC Systems announced the availability of its Thor Data Refinery Cluster on Amazon Web Services. In January 2012, HPCC Systems announced distributed machine learning algorithms.

== See also ==
- Apache Hadoop
- Apache Spark
- Aster Data Systems
- ECL (data-centric programming language)
- ElasticSearch
- Sector/Sphere
- Machine learning
- MapReduce
