= Writing in space =

Instruments to write in outer space

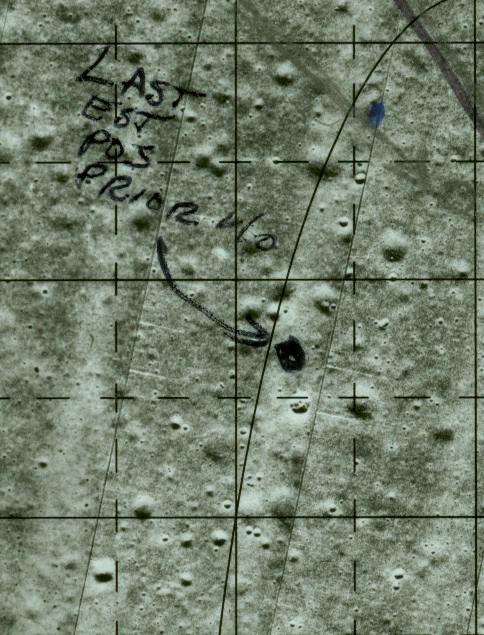
Notes on a map written with a felt-tip pen by Michael Collins onboard command module Columbia

Several instruments have been used to write in outer space, including different types of pencils and pens. Some of them have been unmodified versions of conventional writing instruments; others have been invented specifically to counter the problems with writing in space conditions.

A common misconception states that, faced with the fact that ball-point pens would not write in zero-gravity, the Fisher Space Pen was devised as the result of millions of dollars of unnecessary spending on NASA's part when the Soviet Union took the simpler and cheaper route of just using pencils, making the pen an example of overengineering.

In reality, the space pen was independently developed by Paul C. Fisher, founder of the Fisher Pen Company, with $1 million of his own funds. NASA tested and approved the pen for space use, especially since they were less flammable than pencils, then purchased 400 pens at $2.95 apiece (equivalent to $28 each in 2025). The Soviet Union subsequently also purchased the space pen for its Soyuz spaceflights.

Practically all contemporary writing in space intended for permanent record (e.g., logs, details and results of scientific experiments) is electronic. Hard copy is produced infrequently, as of 2019. The laptops used (as of 2012, IBM/Lenovo ThinkPads) need customization for space use, such as radiation-, heat- and fire-resistance. As of 2021, pens were still being used on the International Space Station.

== Writing requirements ==
Space versus ground recordkeeping presents several serious issues:

=== Contamination control ===
Like submarines before them, space capsules are closed environments, subject to strict contamination requirements. Incoming material is screened for mission threats. Any shedding, including wood, graphite, and ink vapors and droplets, may become a risk. In the case of a crewed capsule, the much smaller recirculating volume, combined with microgravity and an even greater difficulty of resupply, make these requirements even more critical.

Release of wood shavings, graphite dust, broken graphite tips, and ink compounds are a dangerous flight hazard. Lack of gravity makes objects drift, even with air filtration. Any conductive material is a threat to electronics, including the electromechanical switches in use during early crewed space programs. Nonconductive particles may also hamper switch contacts, such as normally-open and rotary mechanisms. Drifting particles are a threat to the eyes (and to a lesser extent an inhalation threat), which may risk execution of a critical procedure. Personnel may don protective gear, but both ground and flight crews are more comfortable and more productive "in shirtsleeves". Paul C. Fisher of Fisher Pen Company recounts that pencils were 'too dangerous to use in space'.

Even before the Apollo 1 fire, the CM crew cabin was reviewed for hazardous materials such as paper, velcro, and even low-temperature plastics. A directive was issued but poorly enforced. When combined with high oxygen content, the Apollo 1 cabin burned within seconds, killing all three crew members.

Cosmonaut Anatoly Solovyev flew with Space Pens starting in the 1980s and states "pencil lead breaks ... and is not good in space capsule; very dangerous to have metal lead particles in zero gravity".

=== Mission assurance and quality records ===
Strict documentation requirements accompany anything as complex as a large-scale aerospace demonstration, let alone crewed spaceflight. Quality assurance records document individual parts, and instances of procedures, for deviances. Low production and flight rates generally result in high variance; most spacecraft designs (to say nothing of individual spacecraft) fly so infrequently that they are considered experimental aircraft. When combined with the stringent weight drivers of orbital and deep-space flight, the quality-control demands are high. Change control records track the evolution of hardware and procedures from their ground testing, initial flights, through necessary corrections and midlife revision and upgrades, and on to retention of engineering knowledge for later programs, and any incident investigations.

When the flight also has scientific or engineering science objectives, low-quality data may affect mission success directly.

Faced with these requirements, pencils or other non-permanent recordkeeping methods are unsatisfactory. The act of taking permanent, high-integrity documentation itself deters kludges, workarounds, and "go fever". The Apollo 1 investigation uncovered procedural and workmanship deficiencies in multiple areas, up to procedures on the pad.

=== Pressure and temperature ===
At sea level, temperature is moderated by the thick atmosphere. As air pressure falls, temperatures can swing more dramatically. Many early crewed missions operated at below standard pressure, to decrease the stresses (and thus, mass) of their capsules. Many did not have separate airlocks, instead exposing the entire cabin to hard vacuum at times. Low pressures also exacerbate contamination issues, as substances acceptable at standard conditions may begin outgassing at lower pressures or higher temperatures. While the Soyuz spacecraft had a 14.7 psi (101 kPa) design pressure, and could use its orbital module as an airlock, the orbital module would be deleted for planned lunar missions. In any case, a pen which was insensitive to pressure and temperature would eliminate the issue (including accidental depressurizations), provide a margin, and allow the ability to record during extravehicular activities.

== Writing instruments ==
=== Pencil ===
While graphite is claimed to be a hazardous material in space because it burns and conducts electricity, two facts mitigate the risks:

- The graphite in pencils is mixed with clay during fabrication of the "lead" to help hold its shape, and would only burn at greater than 1,000 °C (1,832 °F).
- The quantity of graphite particles actually produced during occasional writing would be too small to constitute an electrical hazard.

The wood pencil has been used for writing by the Soviet space programs from the start. It is simple with no moving parts, except for the sharpener. The mechanical pencil was used by NASA during Project Mercury, and it remained one of the most used writing instrument up through the Gemini, Apollo, and Skylab programs. It can be made to be as wide as the width of astronauts' gloves, yet maintain its light weight. There are no wooden components which might catch fire and create dust. However, the pencil lead still creates graphite dust that could conduct electricity.

Despite the potential danger, the issue of pencil leads breaking off and floating around in zero-g doesn't seem to have been a problem during the Gemini or Apollo missions. Astronaut Bill Pogue stated that he never saw any broken leads floating around during his 84-day Skylab 4 mission (on which five or six mechanical pencils were flown), and he believed that any such loose debris would have been quickly drawn into the Skylab air duct system and safely collected in the return filter.

Grease pencils on plastic slates were used both by NASA and the Soviet space program as an early substitute for wood-cased graphite pencils. A grease pencil is simple with no moving parts, and the paper shroud is peeled back when needed. The disadvantage is that the paper wrapper requires disposal. Writing done with the grease pencil is also not as durable as ink on paper.

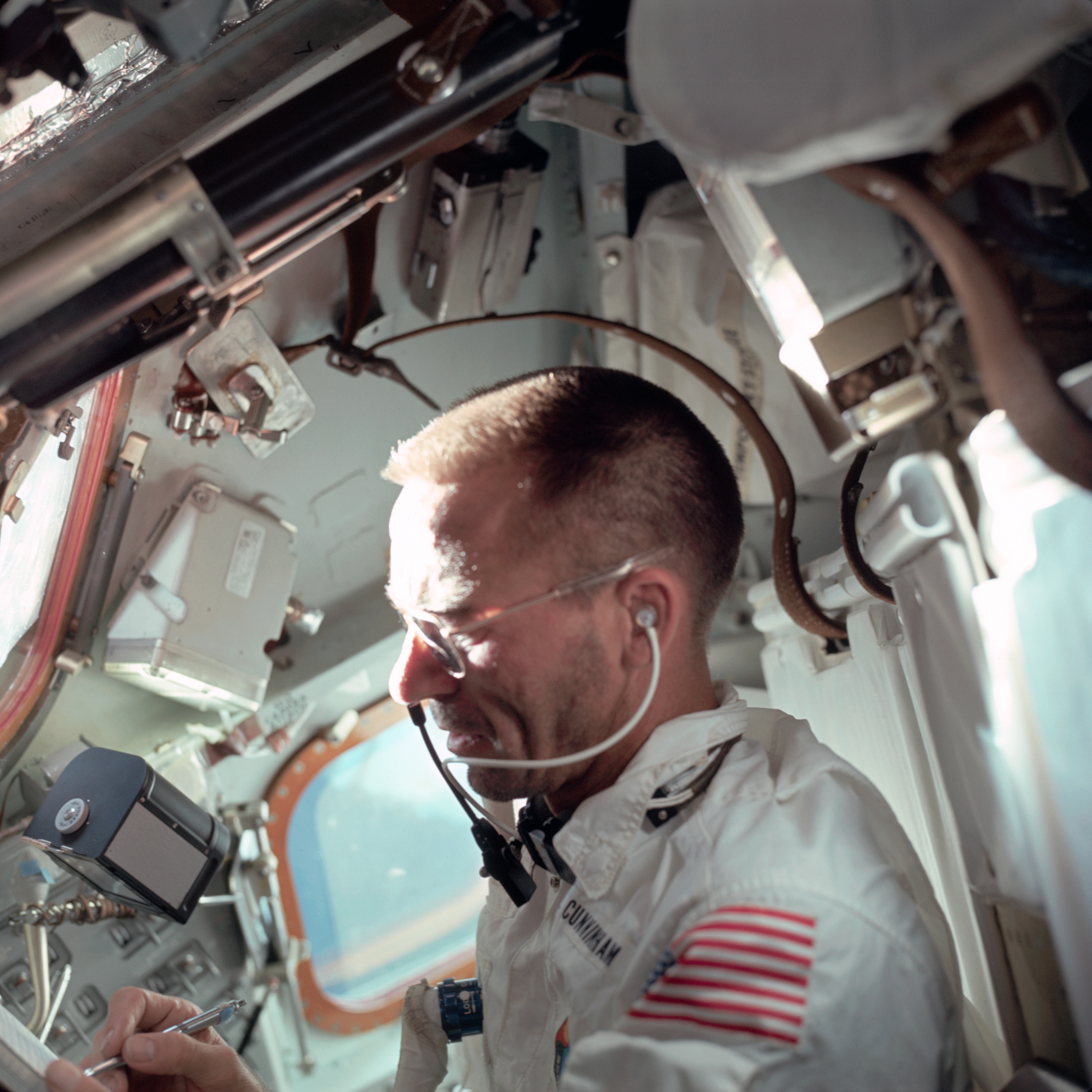
Astronaut Walter Cunningham, Apollo 7 lunar module pilot, writes with a space pen as he is photographed performing flight tasks on the ninth day of the Apollo 7 mission.

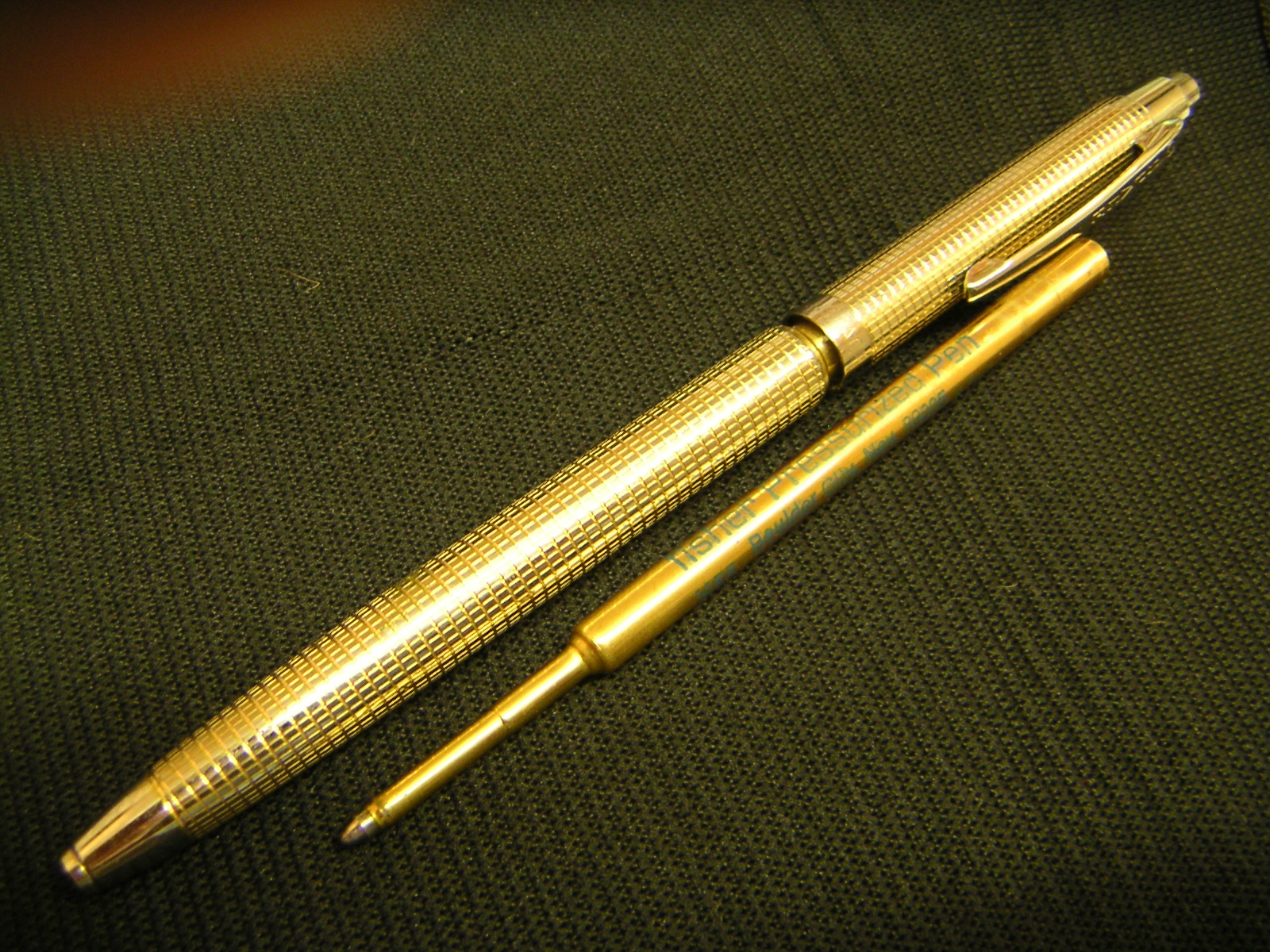
Fisher Space Pen body showing knurlings for grip with removed refill adjacent

=== Pen ===
Ballpoint pens have been used by Soviet and then Russian space programs as a substitute for grease pencils as well as NASA and ESA. The pens are cheap and use paper (which is easily available), and writing done using pen is more permanent than that done with graphite pencils and grease pencils, which makes the ball point pen more suitable for log books and scientific note books. However, the ink is indelible, and depending on composition is subject to outgassing and temperature variations.

Felt-tip pens were used by NASA astronauts in the Apollo missions. However, wick-based instruments are designed around low viscosity, and thus operating temperature and pressure.

==== Fisher Space Pen ====
The Fisher Space Pen is a gas-charged ball point pen that is rugged and works in a wider variety of conditions, such as zero gravity, vacuum and extreme temperatures. Its thixotropic ink and vent-free cartridge release no significant vapor at common temperatures and low pressures. The ink is forced out by compressed nitrogen at a pressure of nearly 45 pounds per square inch (310 kPa), and the standard PR (Pressurized Refill) cartridge is rated to write over 12,000 feet (3,700 m) and at temperatures from −30–250 °F (−34–121 °C). However, it is more expensive than the aforementioned alternatives. It has been used by both NASA and Soviet/Russian astronauts on Apollo, Shuttle, Mir, and ISS missions.

== Bibliography ==
- Duque, Pedro (October 23, 2003). "Diary from Space". ESA.
- Jones, Eric M. (August 11, 2008). "Apollo 11 Image Library: Landing Site Maps/Images".
