= Jsoup =

jsoup Java HTML Parser
- Developer: Jonathan Hedley
- Stable release: 1.24.1 / November 3, 2026; 0 days ago
- Written in: Java
- Operating system: Cross-platform
- Platform: Java (JVM)
- Type: HTML parser
- License: MIT license
- Website: jsoup.org
- Repository: github.com/jhy/jsoup

jsoup is an open-source Java library designed to parse, extract, and manipulate data stored in HTML documents.

== History ==
jsoup was created in 2009 by Jonathan Hedley. It is distributed under the MIT License, a permissive free software license similar to the Creative Commons attribution license.

Hedley's avowed intention in writing jsoup was "to deal with all varieties of HTML found in the wild; from pristine and validating, to invalid tag-soup."

== Projects powered by jsoup ==
jsoup is used in a number of current projects, including Google's OpenRefine data-wrangling tool.

== See also ==
- Comparison of HTML parsers
- Web scraping
- Data wrangling
- MIT License
