= Augustine report =

Two things are known as Augustine report:

- The 1990 report written by the Advisory Committee on the Future of the United States Space Program, chaired by Norman Augustine
- The 2009 report written by the Review of United States Human Space Flight Plans Committee, also chaired by Norman Augustine
