= Inside Airbnb =

Investigatory/watchdog website

Inside Airbnb is an investigatory/watchdog website launched by Murray Cox in 2016. It reports and visualizes scraped data on the property rental marketplace company Airbnb, focusing on highlighting illegal renting on the site and gentrification caused by landlords buying properties to rent on Airbnb.

== History ==
Cox, an Australian-American community activist who moved to Brooklyn in 2008, first scraped information from the Airbnb website in 2014 and compared it to a public data release from the company in December 2015 for New York City. Working with a Canadian, Tom Slee, he found the company had removed over 1000 listings that violated New York's multiple dwelling law just before the data was released. They published a report titled "How Airbnb’s Data Hid the Facts in New York City" in February 2016. Airbnb said the listings were removed for violating policy, and it has since enforced a "one host, one home" policy in New York. Inside Airbnb has since published several more reports, including on how the service affects affordable housing in Los Angeles. After initially welcoming Airbnb with little regulation, Australian local government has used Inside Airbnb data following concerns about pressure on housing supply and affordability. As of 2019, the site provides data on 80 cities around the world.

== Reception ==
Airbnb says Cox's scraped data are inaccurate, because not all listings are active, some properties may be listed multiple times, and Inside Airbnb reports mean income rather than their preferred metric of median income, but Prof. David Wachsmuth of McGill University says the data are a good representation. Nicole Gurran and Peter Phibbs of the University of Sydney found that "This data source has some critical limitations ... Nevertheless, the data provide a useful basis for examining and monitoring Airbnb practices and penetration across local and regional housing markets". Airbnb has repeatedly criticised the site, including calling it "garbage", though Cox met with representatives from the company in February 2019.

== Funding ==
As of 2019, the site costs around $10,000 per year to operate, with those costs covered by cities, researchers, and the hotel trade paying for data access.
