= Criticism of the Space Shuttle program =

Claims that NASA's Space Shuttle program failed to achieve its promised goals

Criticism of the Space Shuttle program stemmed from claims that NASA's Space Shuttle program failed to achieve its promised cost and utility goals, as well as design, cost, management, and safety issues. Fundamentally, it failed in the goal of reducing the cost of space access. Space Shuttle incremental per-pound launch costs ultimately turned out to be considerably higher than those of expendable launchers. In 2010, the incremental cost per flight of the Space Shuttle was $409 million, or $14,186 per kilogram ($6,435 per pound) to low Earth orbit (LEO). In contrast, the comparable Proton launch vehicle cost was $141 million, or $6,721 per kilogram ($3,049 per pound) to LEO and the Soyuz 2.1 was $55 million, or $6,665 per kilogram ($3,023 per pound), despite these launch vehicles not being reusable.

When all design and maintenance costs are taken into account, the final cost of the Space Shuttle program, averaged over all missions and adjusted for inflation (2008), was estimated to come out to $1.5 billion per launch, or $60,000 per kilogram ($27,000 per pound) to LEO. This should be contrasted with the originally envisioned costs of $260 per kilogram ($118 per pound) of payload in 1972 dollars (approximately $554 per pound adjusting for inflation to 2019).

"The Space Shuttle was designed to be cost effective at a weekly flight rate, a goal that was never credible." - Michael D. Griffin, NASA administrator, 2007, Aviation Week.

While the Shuttle did serve a purpose servicing satellites and space stations in orbit, it failed at its original goal of achieving routine, reliable access to space, partly due to multi-year interruptions in launches following Shuttle failures. It was never as economical as expendable rockets for the task of launching satellites. NASA budget pressures partly caused by the chronically high NASA Space Shuttle program costs eliminated NASA crewed space flight beyond low earth orbit for over fifty years, until the 2026 Artemis II mission, and severely curtailed use of uncrewed probes. NASA's promotion of and reliance on the Shuttle slowed domestic commercial expendable launch vehicle (ELV) programs until after the 1986 Challenger disaster.

Two out of the five spacecraft were destroyed in accidents, killing 14 astronauts, the largest loss of life in space flight.

== Purpose of the system ==
The "Space Transportation System" (NASA's formal name for the overall Shuttle program) was created to transport crewmembers and payloads into low Earth orbits. It would afford the opportunity to conduct science experiments on board the shuttle to be used to study the effects of space flight on humans, animals and plants. Other experiments would study how things can be manufactured in space. The shuttle would also enable astronauts to launch satellites from the shuttle and even repair satellites already out in space. The Shuttle was also intended for research into the human response to zero-g.

The Shuttle was originally billed as a space vehicle that would be able to launch once a week and give low launch costs through amortization. Development costs were expected to be recouped through frequent access to space. These claims were made in an effort to obtain budgetary funding from the United States Congress. Beginning in 1981, the space shuttle began to be used for space travel. However, by the mid-1980s the concept of flying that many shuttle missions proved unrealistic and scheduled launch expectations were reduced 50%. Following the Challenger accident in 1986, missions were halted pending safety review. This hiatus became lengthy and ultimately lasted almost three years as arguments over funding and the safety of the program continued. Eventually the military resumed the use of expendable launch vehicles instead. Missions were put on hold again after the loss of Columbia in 2003. Overall, 135 missions were launched during the 30 years after the first orbital flight of Columbia, averaging approximately one every 3 months.

== Costs ==
Some reasons for the higher-than-expected operational costs were:

- NASA secured funding from the US Air Force's budget in exchange for USAF input to the design process. In order to fulfill the USAF's mission to launch payloads into polar orbit, the USAF insisted on a very large cross-range requirement. This necessitated the Shuttle's huge delta wings, which are far larger than the stub wings of the original design. Besides adding drag and weight (almost 20 percent), the excessive number of heat tiles needed to protect the delta wings added greatly to maintenance costs, besides increasing operational risks such as those that resulted in the Columbia disaster.
- At Vandenberg Air Force Base in California, the USAF duplicated the entire infrastructure needed to launch and service the Space Shuttle, at a cost of over 4 billion dollars. Following the Challenger explosion, the facility was dismantled without ever having launched a single Shuttle mission.
- Aerospace engineer Robert Zubrin describes the Shuttle as having been designed "backwards" in that the Orbiter, the harder-to-reuse portion, is made reusable, while part of the booster (the liquid fuel tank) is thrown away even though it is easier to recover since it does not fly so high or fast.
- Maintenance of the thermal protection tiles was a very labor-intensive and costly process, with some 35,000 tiles needing to be inspected individually and with each tile specifically manufactured for one specific slot on the shuttle.
- Due to the complexity of the RS-25 engines, following each flight they required removal for thorough inspection and meticulous maintenance. Prior to the delivery of the Block II engines, the primary engine component, the turbopump, had to be removed, disassembled, and overhauled after each use.
- The toxic propellants used for the OMS/RCS thrusters required special handling, during which time no other activities could be performed in areas sharing the same ventilation system. This increased turn-around time.
- The launch rate was significantly lower than initially expected. While not reducing absolute operating costs, more launches per year gives a lower cost per launch. Some early hypothetical studies examined the possibility of making 55 launches per year (see above), but the maximum possible launch rate was limited to 24 per year based on manufacturing capacity of the Michoud facility in Louisiana that constructs the external tank. Early in shuttle development, the expected launch rate was about 12 per year. Launch rates reached a peak of 9 per year in 1985 but averaged 4.5 for the entire program.
- When the decision was made on the main shuttle contractors in 1972, work was spread among companies to make the program more attractive to Congress, such as the contract for the Solid Rocket Boosters to Morton Thiokol in Utah. Over the course of the program, this raised operational costs, though the consolidation of the US aerospace industry in the 1990s meant that the majority of the Shuttle program expenditure was now with one company: the United Space Alliance, a joint venture of Boeing and Lockheed Martin.

== Cultural issues and problems ==
For a successful technology, reality must take precedence over public relations, for nature cannot be fooled.

— Richard Feynman, Rogers Commission Report, on the Challenger disaster.

Some researchers have criticized a pervasive shift in NASA culture away from safety in order to ensure that launches took place in a timely fashion, sometimes called "go fever". Allegedly, NASA upper-level management embraced this decreased safety focus in the 1980s while some engineers remained wary. According to sociologist Diane Vaughan, the aggressive launch schedules arose in the Reagan years as an attempt to rehabilitate America's post-Vietnam War prestige.

The physicist Richard Feynman, who was appointed to the official inquiry on the Challenger disaster, wrote in his report that working NASA engineers estimated the risk of mission failure to be "on the order of a percent", adding, "Official management, on the other hand, claims to believe the probability of failure is a thousand times less. One reason for this may be an attempt to assure the government of NASA perfection and success in order to ensure the supply of funds. The other may be that they sincerely believed it to be true, demonstrating an almost incredible lack of communication between themselves and their working engineers."

Despite Feynman's warnings, and despite the fact that Vaughan served on safety boards and committees at NASA, the subsequent press coverage has found some evidence that NASA's relative disregard for safety still persisted. For example, leading up to the Columbia disaster, NASA discounted the risk from small foam chunk breakage at launch and assumed that the lack of damage from prior foam collisions suggested the future risk was low.

== Shuttle operations ==
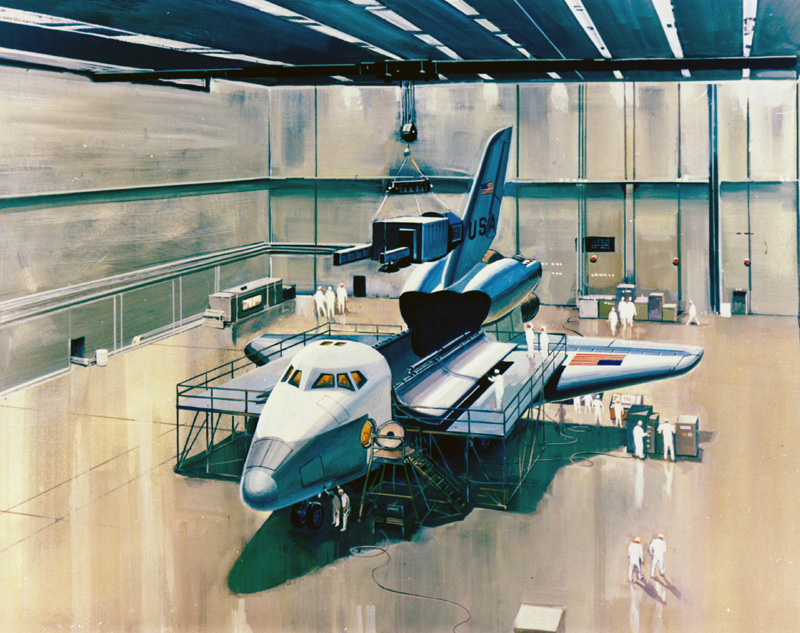
The original, simplified, vision of Space Shuttle ground processing

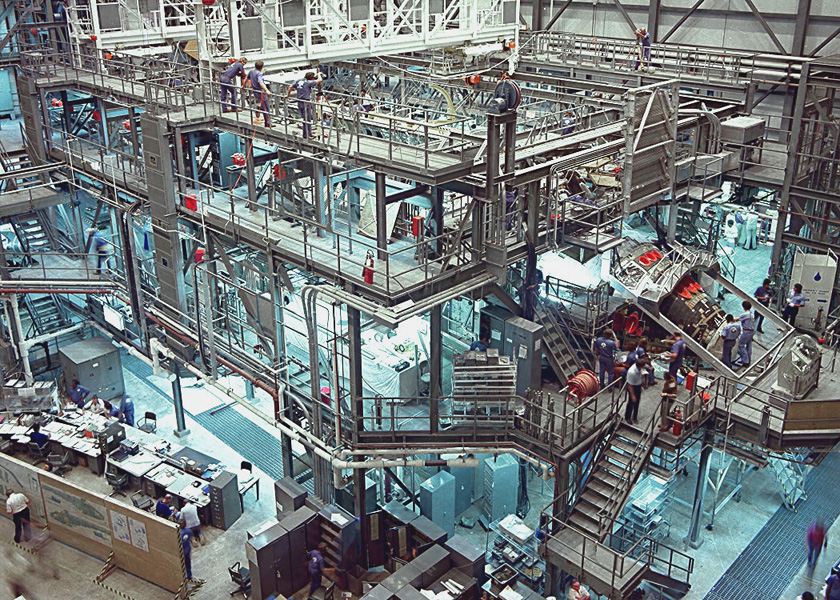
The actual, vastly more complex and much slower, Space Shuttle ground processing

The Shuttle was originally conceived to operate somewhat like an airliner. After landing, the orbiter would be checked out and start being mated to the External Tank and Solid Rocket Boosters, and be ready for launch in as little as two weeks.

In practice, before the loss of Challenger, about half of the turnaround time after a mission was unplanned tests and modifications based on unexpected events that occurred during flight. The process usually took months; Atlantis set the pre-Challenger record by launching twice within 54 days, while Columbia set the post-Challenger record of 88 days. The Shuttle program's goal of returning its crew to Earth safely conflicted with the goal of a rapid and inexpensive payload launch. Furthermore, because in many cases there were no survivable abort modes, many pieces of hardware had to function perfectly and so required careful inspection before each flight. The result was high labor cost, with around 25,000 workers in Shuttle operations and labor costs of about $1 billion per year.

Some shuttle features initially presented as important to Space Station support have proved superfluous:

- As the Soviets demonstrated, capsules and uncrewed supply rockets are sufficient to supply a space station.
- NASA's initial policy of using the Shuttle to launch all crewless payloads declined in practice, and eventually was discontinued. Expendable launch vehicles (ELVs) proved much cheaper and more flexible.
- Following the Challenger disaster, use of the Shuttle to carry the powerful liquid fueled Centaur upper stages planned for interplanetary probes was ruled out for Shuttle safety reasons.
- The Shuttle's history of unexpected delays also made it liable to miss narrow launch windows.
- Advances in technology have made probes smaller and lighter. As a result, many robotic probes and communications satellites can now use expendable launch vehicles, such as the Delta and Atlas V, which are less expensive and perceived to be more reliable than the Shuttle.
- Advances in technology today happen much faster than in the years the Shuttle was developed. Thus the notion that Shuttle would be useful for recovering expensive satellites for return to Earth for refurbishment and updating with new technology is obsoleted; costs have dropped and capabilities increased so much that it is much more cost-effective to abandon old satellites and simply launch new ones.

== Accidents ==
SRB Destruction of Space Shuttle Challenger during STS-51L. O-Ring sealant failure resulted in visible SRB thrust gas impinging against, penetrating, and then detonating the LH2 reservoir of the ET.

While the technical details of the Challenger and Columbia accidents are different, the organizational problems show similarities. Flight engineers' concerns about possible problems were not properly communicated to or understood by senior NASA managers. The vehicle gave ample warning beforehand of abnormal problems. A heavily layered, procedure-oriented bureaucratic structure inhibited necessary communication and action. In addition, both mission failures have been attributed to the flawed notion of a crewed orbiter attached to the flank of the launch vehicle, precluding the possibility of ejection in the case of the Challenger disaster, and exposing the heat shield to damage in the case of Columbia.

With Challenger, the O-ring, which should not have eroded at all, was found to have eroded on earlier shuttle launches. Yet managers felt that because it had previously eroded by no more than 30%, this was not a hazard, as there was "a factor of three safety margin" (in reality, the part had failed, and there was no safety factor). Morton-Thiokol designed and manufactured the SRBs, and during a pre-launch conference call with NASA, Roger Boisjoly, the Thiokol engineer most experienced with the O-rings, pleaded with management repeatedly to cancel or reschedule the launch. He raised concerns that the unusually low temperatures would stiffen the O-rings, preventing a complete seal during flexing of the rocket motor segments, which was exactly what happened on the fatal flight. However, Thiokol's senior managers, under pressure from NASA management, overruled him and allowed the launch to proceed. One week prior to the launch, Thiokol's contract to reprocess the solid rocket boosters was also due for review, and cancelling the flight was an action that Thiokol management wanted to avoid. Challenger's O-rings eroded completely through as predicted, resulting in the complete destruction of the spacecraft and the death of all seven astronauts on board.

The breakup of Columbia was captured by a forward-looking infrared (FLIR) camera mounted on an Apache helicopter conducting training in Fort Hood, Texas.

Columbia was destroyed because of damaged thermal protection from foam debris that broke off from the external tank during ascent. The foam had not been designed or expected to break off, but had been observed in the past to do so without incident. The original shuttle operational specification said the orbiter thermal protection tiles were not designed to withstand any debris hits at all. Over time NASA managers gradually accepted more tile damage, similar to how O-ring damage was accepted. The Columbia Accident Investigation Board called this tendency the "normalization of deviance" – a gradual acceptance of events outside the design tolerances of the craft simply because they had not been catastrophic to date.

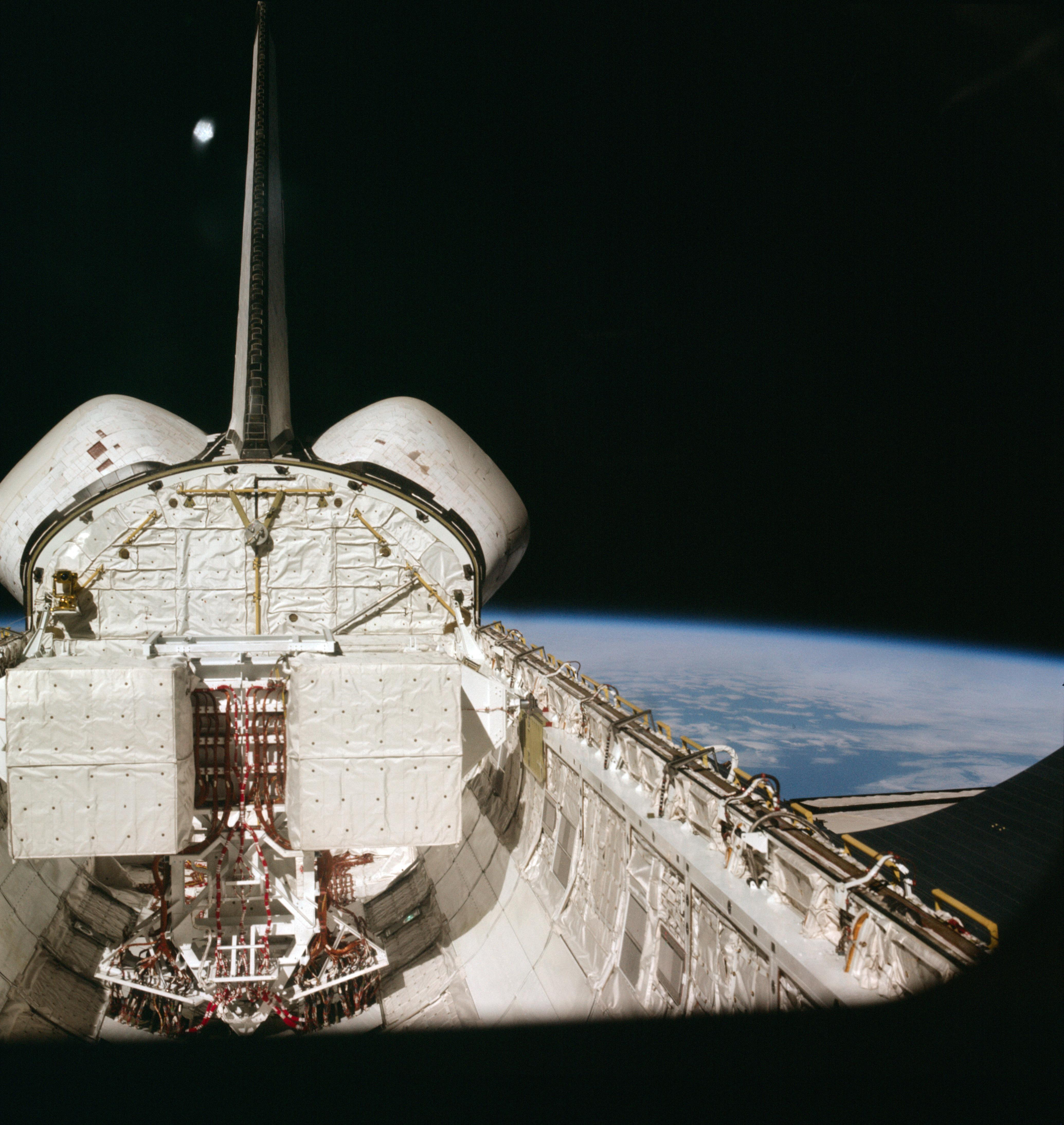
STS-1 photo showing missing thermal tiles on OMS pods to the left and right of the vertical tail fin

The subject of missing or damaged thermal tiles on the Shuttle fleet only became an issue following the loss of Columbia in 2003, as it broke up on re-entry. In fact, Shuttles had previously come back missing as many as 20 tiles without any problem. STS-1 and STS-41 had both flown with missing thermal tiles from the Orbital Maneuvering System pods (visible to the crew). The problem on Columbia was that the damage was sustained from a foam strike to the reinforced carbon-carbon leading edge panel of the wing, not the heat tiles. The first Shuttle mission, STS-1, had a protruding gap filler that diverted hot gas into the right wheel well on re-entry, resulting in a buckling of the right main landing gear door.

=== Risk contributors ===
An example of technical risk analysis for an STS mission is SPRA iteration 3.1 top risk contributors for STS-133:

1. Micro-Meteoroid Orbital Debris (MMOD) strikes
2. RS-25-induced or RS-25 catastrophic failure (the Space Shuttle Main Engine)
3. Ascent debris strikes to TPS leading to LOCV on orbit or entry
4. Crew error during entry
5. RSRM-induced RSRM catastrophic failure (RSRM are the rocket motors of the SRBs)
6. COPV failure (COPV are tanks inside the orbiter that hold gas at high pressure)

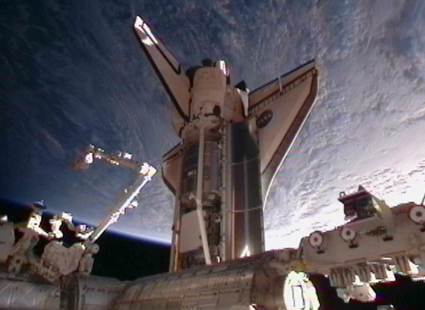
Discovery at ISS in 2011 (STS-133).

John Young and Jerry L. Ross were among those astronauts who believed that the shuttle was always an experimental craft, not an operational vehicle for routine spaceflight as President Ronald Reagan declared after STS-4. Rick Hauck said in 2017 that before STS-1 he saw an analysis estimating the risk of loss of the vehicle as 1 in 280, but an internal NASA risk assessment study (conducted by the Shuttle Program Safety and Mission Assurance Office at Johnson Space Center) released in late 2010 or early 2011 concluded that the agency had seriously underestimated the level of risk involved in operating the Shuttle. The report assessed that there was a 1 in 9 chance of a catastrophic disaster during the first nine flights of the Shuttle but that safety improvements had later improved the risk ratio to 1 in 90. In 1984 Reagan signed a National Security Decision Directive stating that the shuttle would not be "fully operational" until it could fly 24 missions a year, perhaps by 1988; the shuttle never flew more often than the nine missions of 1985, and averaged about six missions a year between 1988 and 2003.

Although many NASA astronauts criticized the payload specialist program, in part because they did not believe less-trained outsiders were fully aware of the risks of spaceflight, full-time astronauts may not have been either. Charles Bolden was amazed to learn after the loss of Columbia that the "impenetrable" leading wing edges of the vehicle he flew for 14 years were less than an inch thick. NASA in October 1982 predicted 37 shuttle flights by early 1986, but Challenger's loss was the 25th shuttle flight. Hauck, with much experience flying dangerous aircraft at the United States Naval Test Pilot School, said "If I knew in advance that one in twenty-five would fail, I would probably think twice about flying three (as I did) out of the first twenty-six flights".

== Retrospect ==
While the system was developed within the original cost and time estimates given to President Richard M. Nixon in 1971, the operational costs, flight rate, payload capacity, and reliability by the time of the February 2003 Columbia accident proved to be much worse than originally anticipated. A year before STS-1's April 1981 launch, Gregg Easterbrook in The Washington Monthly accurately forecasted many of the Shuttle's issues, including an overambitious launch schedule and the consequently higher-than-expected marginal cost per flight; the risks of depending on the Shuttle for all payloads, civilian and military; the lack of a survivable abort scenario if a Solid Rocket Booster were to fail; and the fragility of the Shuttle's thermal protection system. General Lew Allen, Chief of Staff of the United States Air Force, reportedly said that year that he would have canceled the shuttle.

In order to get the Shuttle approved, NASA over-promised its economies and utility. To justify its very large fixed operational program cost, NASA initially forced all domestic, internal, and Department of Defense payloads to the shuttle. When that proved impossible (after the Challenger disaster), NASA used the International Space Station (ISS) as a justification for the shuttle. NASA administrator Michael D. Griffin argued in a 2007 paper that the Saturn program, if continued, could have provided six crewed launches per year – two of them to the Moon – at the same cost as the Shuttle program, with an additional ability to loft infrastructure for further missions:

If we had done all this, we would be on Mars today, not writing about it as a subject for "the next 50 years." We would have decades of experience operating long-duration space systems in Earth orbit, and similar decades of experience in exploring and learning to utilize the Moon.

Some had argued that the Shuttle program was flawed. Achieving a reusable vehicle with early 1970s technology forced design decisions that compromised operational reliability and safety. Reusable main engines were made a priority. This necessitated that they not burn up upon atmospheric reentry, which in turn made mounting them on the orbiter itself (the one part of the Shuttle system where reuse was paramount) a seemingly logical decision. However, this had the following consequences:

- a more expensive "clean sheet" engine design was needed, using more expensive materials, as opposed to existing and proven off-the-shelf alternatives (such as the Saturn V mains);
- increased ongoing maintenance costs related to keeping the reusable SSMEs in flying condition after each launch, costs which in total may have exceeded that of building disposable main engines for each launch.

A concern expressed by the 1990 Augustine Commission was that "the civil space program is overly dependent upon the Space Shuttle for access to space." The committee pointed out, "that it was, for example, inappropriate in the case of Challenger to risk the lives of seven astronauts and nearly one-fourth of NASA's launch assets to place in orbit a communications satellite."

There are some NASA spin-off technologies related to the Space Shuttle program which have been successfully developed into commercial products, such as using heat-resistant materials developed to protect the Shuttle on reentry in suits for municipal and aircraft rescue firefighters.

== See also ==
- Buran (spacecraft)
- Skylab 4
