= Michael Hanna (judge) =

Irish barrister, High Court judge since 2004

Judge of the High Court
- In office 15 November 2004 – 13 July 2023
- Nominated by: Government of Ireland
- Appointed by: Mary McAleese

Personal details
- Born: Belfast, Northern Ireland
- Education: Trinity College Dublin; King's Inns

Michael Anthony Patrick Hanna is a retired Irish judge who served as a Judge of the High Court from 2004 to 2023.

== Early life ==
Hanna originates from Belfast and was educated at St MacNissi's College. His father was Frank Hanna, a Northern Ireland Labour Party MP. He was educated at Trinity College Dublin and the King's Inns. He is a former auditor of the College Historical Society.

He became a barrister in 1976 and a senior counsel in 1996. Hanna's practice was focused on the Dublin and South-Eastern circuits, where he specialised in personal injury cases and the law of tort. Criminal cases also formed part of his practice.

== Judicial career ==
Hanna was appointed to the High Court in 2004. He was appointed following recommendation by the Judicial Appointments Advisory Board. He presided over a planning law case involving Van Morrison and his wife Michelle Rocca in 2010. He was the judge in a 2011 case taken by Ryanair against a German ticket sale website, in which he held that ticket scraping was a breach of Ryanair's website terms. This was considered to be the first Irish case involving the enforceability of online terms of service. He often acted as judge at the Court of Criminal Appeal, prior to its disbandment following the establishment of the Court of Appeal.

He frequently heard personal injuries cases when he was on the bench of the High Court. He applied a test of "ordinary common sense" to assess evidence in a personal injuries case involving a woman who had slipped in a car park. This test was endorsed in a judgment of Mary Irvine in the Court of Appeal.

His final sitting as a judge was on 13 July 2023.

== Personal life ==
He became ill while in Spain in 2014 and was in an induced coma. He was unable to hear cases for a period of time following. Hanna is a singer of opera.
