= Generalized tree alignment =

In computational phylogenetics, generalized tree alignment is the problem of producing a multiple sequence alignment and a phylogenetic tree on a set of sequences simultaneously, as opposed to separately.

Formally, Generalized tree alignment is the following optimization problem.

Input: A set $S$ and an edit distance function $d$ between sequences,

Output: A tree $T$ leaf-labeled by $S$ and labeled with sequences at the internal nodes, such that $\Sigma_{e \in T} d(e)$ is minimized, where $d(e)$ is the edit distance between the endpoints of $e$.

Note that this is in contrast to tree alignment, where the tree is provided as input.
