= Data janitor =

A data janitor is a person who works to take big data and condense it into useful amounts of information. Also known as a "data wrangler", a data janitor sifts through data for companies in the information technology industry. A multitude of start-ups rely on large amounts of data, so a data janitor works to help these businesses with this basic, but difficult process of interpreting data.

While it is a commonly held belief that data janitor work is fully automated, many data scientists are employed primarily as data janitors. The information technology industry has been increasingly turning towards new sources of data gathered on consumers, so data janitors have become more commonplace in recent years.
