= Connection string =

In computing, a connection string is a string that specifies information about a data source and the means of connecting to it. It is passed in code to an underlying driver or provider in order to initiate the connection. Whilst commonly used for a database connection, the data source could also be a spreadsheet or text file.

The connection string may include attributes such as the name of the driver, server and database, as well as security information such as user name and password.

== Examples ==
This example shows a PostgreSQL connection string for connecting to wikipedia.com with SSL and a connection timeout of 180 seconds:

DRIVER={PostgreSQL Unicode};SERVER=www.wikipedia.com;SSL=true;SSLMode=require;DATABASE=wiki;UID=wikiuser;Connect Timeout=180;PWD=ashiknoor

Users of Oracle databases can specify connection strings:

- on the command line (as in: sqlplus scott/tiger@connection_string )
- via environment variables ($TWO_TASK in Unix-like environments; %TWO_TASK% in Microsoft Windows environments)
- in local configuration files (such as the default $ORACLE_HOME/network/admin.tnsnames.ora)
- in LDAP-capable directory services

== See also ==
- Data source name
