= Datasource =

A datasource or DataSource is a name given to the connection set up to a database from a server. The name is commonly used when creating a query to the database. The data source name (DSN) need not be the same as the filename for the database. For example, a database file named friends.mdb could be set up with a DSN of school. Then DSN school would be used to refer to the database when performing a query.

== Sun's version of DataSource ==
A factory for connections to the physical data source that this DataSource object represents. An alternative to the DriverManager facility, a DataSource object is the preferred means of getting a connection. An object that implements the DataSource interface will typically be registered with a naming service based on the Java Naming and Directory Interface (JNDI) API.

The DataSource interface is implemented by a driver vendor. There are three types of implementations:

- Basic implementation — produces a standard Connection object
- Connection pooling implementation — produces a Connection object that will automatically participate in connection pooling. This implementation works with a middle-tier connection pooling manager.
- Distributed transaction implementation — produces a Connection object that may be used for distributed transactions and almost always participates in connection pooling. This implementation works with a middle-tier transaction manager and almost always with a connection pooling manager.

A DataSource object has properties that can be modified when necessary. For example, if the data source is moved to a different server, the property for the server can be changed. The benefit is that because the data source's properties can be changed, any code accessing that data source does not need to be changed.

A driver that is accessed via a DataSource object does not register itself with the DriverManager. Rather, a DataSource object is retrieved through a lookup operation and then used to create a Connection object. With a basic implementation, the connection obtained through a DataSource object is identical to a connection obtained through the DriverManager facility.

== Sun's DataSource Overview ==
A DataSource object is the representation of a data source in the Java programming language. In basic terms, a data source is a facility for storing data. It can be as sophisticated as a complex database for a large corporation or as simple as a file with rows and columns. A data source can reside on a remote server, or it can be on a local desktop machine. Applications access a data source using a connection, and a DataSource object can be thought of as a factory for connections to the particular data source that the DataSource instance represents. The DataSource interface provides two methods for establishing a connection with a data source.

Using a DataSource object is the preferred alternative to using the DriverManager for establishing a connection to a data source. They are similar to the extent that the DriverManager class and DataSource interface both have methods for creating a connection, methods for getting and setting a timeout limit for making a connection, and methods for getting and setting a stream for logging.

Their differences are more significant than their similarities, however. Unlike the DriverManager, a DataSource object has properties that identify and describe the data source it represents. Also, a DataSource object works with a Java Naming and Directory Interface (JNDI) naming service and can be created, deployed, and managed separately from the applications that use it. A driver vendor will provide a class that is a basic implementation of the DataSource interface as part of its Java Database Connectivity (JDBC) 2.0 or 3.0 driver product. What a system administrator does to register a DataSource object with a JNDI naming service and what an application does to get a connection to a data source using a DataSource object registered with a JNDI naming service are described later in this chapter.

Being registered with a JNDI naming service gives a DataSource object two major advantages over the DriverManager. First, an application does not need to hardcode driver information, as it does with the DriverManager. A programmer can choose a logical name for the data source and register the logical name with a JNDI naming service. The application uses the logical name, and the JNDI naming service will supply the DataSource object associated with the logical name. The DataSource object can then be used to create a connection to the data source it represents.

The second major advantage is that the DataSource facility allows developers to implement a DataSource class to take advantage of features like connection pooling and distributed transactions. Connection pooling can increase performance dramatically by reusing connections rather than creating a new physical connection each time a connection is requested. The ability to use distributed transactions enables an application to do the heavy duty database work of large enterprises.

Although an application may use either the DriverManager or a DataSource object to get a connection, using a DataSource object offers significant advantages and is the recommended way to establish a connection.

Since 1.4

Since Java EE 6 a JNDI-bound DataSource can alternatively be configured in a declarative way directly from within the application. This alternative is particularly useful for self-sufficient applications or for transparently using an embedded database.

== Yahoo's version of DataSource ==
A DataSource is an abstract representation of a live set of data that presents a common predictable API for other objects to interact with. The nature of your data, its quantity, its complexity, and the logic for returning query results all play a role in determining your type of DataSource. For small amounts of simple textual data, a JavaScript array is a good choice. If your data has a small footprint but requires a simple computational or transformational filter before being displayed, a JavaScript function may be the right approach. For very large datasets—for example, a robust relational database—or to access a third-party webservice you'll certainly need to leverage the power of a Script Node or XHR DataSource.
