= Link farm =

Group of websites that link to each other

A diagram of a link farm. Each circle represents a website, and each arrow represents a pair of hyperlinks between two websites.

On the World Wide Web, a link farm is any group of websites that all hyperlink to other sites in the group for the purpose of increasing SEO rankings. In graph-theoretic terms, a link farm is a clique. Although some link farms can be created by hand, most are created through automated programs and services. A link farm is a form of spamming the index of a web search engine (sometimes called spamdexing). Other link exchange systems are designed to allow individual websites to selectively exchange links with other relevant websites and are not considered a form of spamdexing.

Search engines require ways to confirm page relevancy. A known method is to examine for one-way links coming directly from relevant websites. The process of building links should not be confused with being listed on link farms, as the latter requires reciprocal return links, which often renders the overall backlink advantage useless. This is due to oscillation, causing confusion over which is the vendor site and which is the promoting site.

== History ==
Link farms were first developed by search engine optimizers (SEOs) in 1999 to take advantage of the Inktomi search engine's dependence upon link popularity. Although link popularity is used by some search engines to help establish a ranking order for search results, the Inktomi engine at the time maintained two indexes. Search results were produced from the primary index, which was limited to approximately 100 million listings. Pages with few inbound links fell out of the Inktomi index on a monthly basis.

Inktomi was targeted for manipulation through link farms because it was then used by several independent but popular search engines. Yahoo!, then the most popular search service, also used Inktomi results to supplement its directory search feature. The link farms helped stabilize listings, primarily for online business websites that had few natural links from larger, more stable sites in the Inktomi index.

Link farm exchanges were at first handled on an informal basis, but several service companies were founded to provide automated registration, categorization, and link page updates to member websites.

When the Google search engine became popular, search engine optimizers learned that Google's ranking algorithm depended in part on a link-weighting scheme called PageRank. Rather than simply count all inbound links equally, the PageRank algorithm determines that some links may be more valuable than others and therefore assigns them more weight than others. Link farming was adapted to help increase the PageRank of member pages.

However, the link farms became susceptible to manipulation by unscrupulous webmasters who joined the services, received inbound linkage, and then found ways to hide their outbound links or to avoid posting any links on their sites at all. Link farm managers had to implement quality controls and monitor member compliance with their rules to ensure fairness.

Alternative link farm products emerged, particularly link-finding software that identified potential reciprocal link partners, sent them template-based emails offering to exchange links, and created directory-like link pages for websites, in the hope of building their link popularity and PageRank. These link farms are sometimes considered a spamdexing strategy.

Search engines countered the link farm movement by identifying specific attributes associated with link farm pages and filtering those pages from indexing and search results. In some cases, entire domains were removed from the search engine indexes in order to prevent them from influencing search results.

== Blog network ==
A private blog network (PBN) is a group of blogs that are owned by the same entity. A blog network can either be a group of loosely connected blogs or a group of blogs that are owned by the same company. The purpose of such a network is usually to promote other sites outside the network and therefore increase the search engine rankings or advertising revenue generated from online advertising on the sites the PBN links to.

In September 2014, Google targeted private blog networks (PBNs) with manual action ranking penalties. This served to dissuade search engine optimization and online marketers from using PBNs to increase their online rankings. The "thin content" warnings are closely tied to Panda, which focuses on thin content and on-page quality. PBNs have a history of being targeted by Google and therefore may not be the safest option. Since Google is on the search for blog networks, they are not always linked together. In fact, interlinking your blogs could help Google, and a single exposed blog could reveal the whole blog network by looking at the outbound links.

A blog network may also refer to a central website, such as WordPress, where a user creates an account and is then able to use their own blog. The created blog forms part of a network because it uses either a subdomain or a subfolder of the main domain, although in all other ways it can be entirely autonomous. This is also known as a hosted blog platform and usually uses the free WordPress Multisite software.

Hosted blog networks are also known as Web 2.0 networks, since they became more popular with the rise of the second phase of web development.

== See also ==
- Click farm – Fraudulent practice involving bot accounts spam clicking ads
- Cloaking – Search engine optimization technique
- Content farm – Organization that creates web content optimised for views
- Doorway page – Misleading web page
- Keyword stuffing – Search engine optimization technique to gain an unfair rank advantage
- Link building, also known as Methods of website linking – Efforts to increase the number of high-quality links pointing to a website
- Scraper site – Website which copies content from others
- Server farm – Collection of computer servers
- Spam blog – Blog to increase search rankings
- Spam in blogs – Form of spamdexing
- Strongly connected component – Partition of a graph whose components are reachable from all vertices
- Web portal, also known as Web guide – Website that integrates applications, processes, and services
