= Augustine Committee =

Group established by Dan Quayle to study US human spaceflight's future

The Advisory Committee on the Future of the United States Space Program, commonly known as the Augustine Committee, was a 1990 space policy group requested by Vice President Dan Quayle, chairman of the National Space Council. The objective of the committee was to evaluate the long-term future of NASA and the United States civilian space program. The committee's final report (known as the Augustine Report) recommended that the space program should comprise five activities—space science, Earth science, human spaceflight, space technology and space transportation—with space science as the highest priority for funding. It also proposed an unmanned launch vehicle to replace some Space Shuttle launches, and a scaled-back redesign of space station Freedom.

== Original recommendations ==
In its original report, the committee ranked five space activities in order of priority:

1. Space science
2. Technology development
3. Earth science
4. Unmanned launch vehicle
5. Human spaceflight

At a dinner with Vice President Quayle and committee members, Office of Management and Budget director Richard Darman argued that the low priority projects would be eliminated during the budget process. The committee members decided to change their report. Space science was still given first priority, but the other activities were assigned equal priority behind space science.

After discussing the Space Shuttle Challenger disaster the executive summary of the committee's report recommended, "saving the Space Shuttle for those missions requiring human presence."

== Members ==
The committee had twelve members in total, with one chairman and one vice chairman.

- Norman Augustine (chairman), CEO of Martin Marietta
- Laurel L. Wilkening (vice chairman), provost of the University of Washington
- Edward Aldridge, president of the McDonnell Douglas Electronic Systems Company
- Joseph Allen, former astronaut and president of Space Industries International
- D. James Baker, president of Joint Oceanographic Institutions
- Edward Boland, former Massachusetts congressman
- Daniel Fink, former senior vice president of General Electric
- Don Fuqua, president of the Aerospace Industries Association of America
- Robert Herres, former commander of the United States Space Command
- David Kearns, chairman of Xerox
- Louis Lanzerotti, chairman of the Space Studies Board
- Thomas Paine, former NASA administrator

== See also ==
- Criticism of the Space Shuttle program
- Review of United States Human Space Flight Plans Committee
- Space Exploration Initiative
