= Dirty data =

Incomplete or inaccurate data

Dirty data, also known as rogue data, are inaccurate, incomplete or inconsistent data, especially in a computer system or database.

Dirty data can contain such mistakes as spelling or punctuation errors, incorrect data associated with a field, incomplete or outdated data, or even data that has been duplicated in the database. They can be cleaned through a process known as data cleansing.

== Dirty Data (Social Science) ==
In sociology, dirty data refer to secretive data the discovery of which is discrediting to those who kept the data secret. Following the definition of Gary T. Marx, Professor Emeritus of MIT, dirty data are one among four types of data:

- Nonsecretive and nondiscrediting data:
  - Routinely available information.
- Secretive and nondiscrediting data:
  - Strategic and fraternal secrets, privacy.
- Nonsecretive and discrediting data:
  - sanction immunity,
  - normative dissensus,
  - selective dissensus,
  - making good on a threat for credibility,
  - discovered dirty data.
- Secretive and discrediting data: Hidden and dirty data.

== See also ==
- Data janitor
- Signal noise
