= Search engine scraping =

Process of harvesting data from search engine results pages

Search engine scraping scraping refers to the automated extraction of URLs, descriptions, and other data from search engine results. It is a specialized subset of web scraping focused exclusively on search engine content.

Most commonly larger search engine optimization (SEO) providers depend on regularly scraping keywords from search engines to monitor the competitive position of their customers' websites for relevant keywords or their indexing status.

The process of entering a website and extracting data in an automated fashion is also often called "crawling". Search engines get almost all their data from automated crawling bots.

== Difficulties ==
Google is by far the largest search engine with most users in numbers as well as most revenue in creative advertisements, which makes Google the most important search engine to scrape for SEO related companies.

Although Google does not take legal action against scraping, it uses a range of defensive methods that makes scraping their results a challenging task, even when the scraping tool is realistically spoofing a normal web browser:

- Google is using a complex system of request rate limitation which can vary for each language, country, User-Agent as well as depending on the keywords or search parameters. The rate limitation can make it unpredictable when accessing a search engine automated, as the behaviour patterns are not known to the outside developer or user.
- Network and IP limitations are as well part of the scraping defense systems. Search engines can not easily be tricked by changing to another IP, while using proxies is a very important part in successful scraping. The diversity and abusive history of an IP is important as well.
- Offending IPs and offending IP networks can easily be stored in a blacklist database to detect offenders much faster. The fact that most ISPs give dynamic IP addresses to customers requires that such automated bans be only temporary, do not block innocent users.
- Behaviour based detection is the most difficult defense system. Search engines serve their pages to millions of users every day, this provides a large amount of behaviour information. A scraping script or bot is not behaving like a real user, aside from having non-typical access times, delays and session times the keywords being harvested might be related to each other or include unusual parameters. Google for example has a very sophisticated behaviour analyzation system, possibly using deep learning software to detect unusual patterns of access. It can detect unusual activity much faster than other search engines.
- HTML markup changes, depending on the methods used to harvest the content of a website, even a small change in HTML data can render a scraping tool broken until it is updated.
- General changes in detection systems. In the past years search engines have tightened their detection systems nearly month by month making it more and more difficult to reliable scrape as the developers need to experiment and adapt their code regularly.

== Detection ==
When search engine defense thinks an access might be automated, the search engine can react differently.

The first layer of defense is a captcha page where the user is prompted to verify they are a real person and not a bot or tool. Solving the captcha will create a cookie that permits access to the search engine again for a while. After about one day, the captcha page is displayed again.

The second layer of defense is a similar error page but without captcha, in such a case the user is completely blocked from using the search engine until the temporary block is lifted, or the user changes their IP.

The third layer of defense is a long-term block of the entire network segment. Google has blocked large network blocks for months. This sort of block is likely triggered by an administrator and only happens if a scraping tool is sending a very high number of requests.

All these forms of detection may also happen to a normal user, especially users sharing the same IP address or network class (IPV4 ranges as well as IPv6 ranges).

== Methods of scraping ==
To scrape a search engine successfully, the two major factors are time and amount.

The more keywords a user needs to scrape and the smaller the time for the job, the more difficult scraping will be and the more developed a scraping script or tool needs to be.

Scraping scripts need to overcome a few technical challenges.

- Utilizing IP rotation with proxies. These proxies should be exclusive (unshared) and not flagged on any blacklists.
- Proper time management, time between keyword changes, pagination as well as correctly placed delays Effective long-term scraping rates can vary from only 3–5 requests (keywords or pages) per hour up to 100 and more per hour for each IP address / Proxy in use. The quality of IPs, methods of scraping, keywords requested and language/country requested can greatly affect the possible maximum rate.
- Correct handling of URL parameters, cookies as well as HTTP headers to emulate a user with a typical browser
- HTML DOM parsing (extracting URLs, descriptions, ranking position, sitelinks and other relevant data from the HTML code)
- Error handling, automated reaction on captcha or block pages and other unusual responses

== Programming languages ==
When developing a scraper for a search engine, almost any programming language can be used. Although, depending on performance requirements, some languages will be favorable.

PHP is a commonly used language to write scraping scripts for websites or backend services, since it has powerful capabilities built-in (DOM parsers, libcURL).. Ruby on Rails as well as Python are also frequently used to automated scraping jobs.

Additionally, bash scripting can be used together with cURL as a command line tool to scrape a search engine.

== Legal ==
When scraping websites and services the legal part is often a big concern for companies, for web scraping it greatly depends on the country a scraping user/company is from as well as which data or website is being scraped. With many different court rulings all over the world.

However, when it comes to scraping search engines the situation is different, search engines usually do not list intellectual property as they just repeat or summarize information they scraped from other websites.

The largest public known incident of a search engine being scraped happened in 2011 when Microsoft was caught scraping unknown keywords from Google for their own, rather new Bing service, but even this incident did not result in a court case.

== See also ==
- Comparison of HTML parsers
