= Comparison of HTML parsers =

HTML parsers are software for automated Hypertext Markup Language (HTML) parsing. They have two main purposes:

- HTML traversal: offer an interface for programmers to easily access and modify the "HTML string code". Canonical example: DOM parsers.
- HTML clean: to fix invalid HTML and to improve the layout and indent style of the resulting markup. Canonical example: HTML Tidy.

Parser	License	Implementation language(s)	Latest date*	HTML parsing	HTML5-compliant parsing	Clean HTML**	Update HTML***
HTML Tidy	W3C license	ANSI C	2021-07-17	Yes	Yes	Yes	Yes
HtmlUnit	Apache License 2.0	Java	2023-10-31	Yes	?	No	No
Beautiful Soup	MIT License	Python	2023-04-07	Yes	Yes	?	No
jsoup	MIT License	Java	2026-11-03	Yes	Yes	Yes	Yes
Parser	License	Implementation language(s)	Latest date*	HTML Parsing	HTML5-compliant Parsing	Clean HTML**	Update HTML***

* Latest release (of significant changes) date.
** sanitize (generating standard-compatible web-page, reduce spam, etc.) and clean (strip out surplus presentational tags, remove XSS code, etc.) HTML code.
*** Updates HTML4.X to XHTML or to HTML5, converting deprecated tags (ex. CENTER) to valid ones (ex. DIV with style="text-align:center;").
