= Go fever =

Attitude of being in a rush to get a project done while overlooking potential problems

In the US space industry, "go fever" (also "launch fever") is an informal term used to refer to the overall attitude of being in a rush or hurry to get a project or task done while overlooking potential problems or mistakes. The term was coined after the Apollo 1 fire in 1967 and has been referred to in subsequent NASA incidents such as the Space Shuttle Challenger disaster in 1986 and the Space Shuttle Columbia disaster in 2003. The corresponding phenomenon in Aviation is known informally as get there-itis or formally as plan continuation error.

== Causes ==
"Go fever" results from both individual and collective aspects of human behavior. It is due to the tendency as individuals to be overly committed to a previously chosen course of action based on time and resources already expended (sunk costs) despite reduced or insufficient future benefits, or even considerable risks. It is also due to both general budget concerns and the desire of members of a team not to be seen as not fully committed to the team's goals or even as interfering with the team's progress or success.

"Go fever" is comparable to the "groupthink" phenomenon, where a group makes a bad decision for the sake of cordiality and maintaining the group's atmosphere. The term was coined by social psychologist Irving Janis in 1972. The psychology behind "go fever" is also reminiscent of "get-home-itis", the irrational desire to press on unnecessarily to a desired destination despite significant (but likely temporary) adverse conditions.

== See also ==
- Groupthink
- Sunk cost

== Bibliography ==
- Hanks, Tom (Executive Producer) (1998). From the Earth to the Moon (DVD). HBO.
- The Nation: NASA's Curse?; 'Groupthink' Is 30 Years Old, And Still Going Strong
