= PayPal (disambiguation) =

PayPal is an American multinational financial technology company operating an online payments system.

PayPal may also refer to:

- Pay Pal (The Simpsons), an episode of the American animated television series The Simpsons.
- PayPal 14, a group of defendants allegedly connected with the hacktivist group Anonymous.
- PayPal Credit, a proprietary buy now, pay later payment method offered on merchant websites.
- PayPal Honey, an American technology company and a subsidiary of PayPal.
- PayPal Mafia, a group of former PayPal employees and founders who have since founded and/or developed additional technology companies based in Silicon Valley.
- PayPal Park, a soccer-specific stadium in San Jose, California.
- The PayPal Wars, a book by former PayPal marketing executive Eric M. Jackson.
- Trojan.Win32.DNSChanger, a backdoor trojan that redirects users to various malicious websites, with a variant named PayPal-2.5.200-MSWin32-x86-2005.exe.
