= Rachael Rapraeger =

American radiology technician

Rachael Michelle Rapraeger is an American radiology technologist who was born in Macon, Georgia and was convicted of 10 counts of reckless conduct and 10 counts of computer fraud at Perry Hospital in Perry, Georgia. In September 2010 she was indicted for giving false mammogram results to as many as 1,289 women, 10 of who later were reported to have breast cancer. During the process, at least 2 women died. According to Rabb Wilkerson, she entered the data herself. She was sentenced to serve up to six months in a detention center, to serve 10 years on probation during which she can't work in the health care field and to pay a $12,500 fine.

== Trial ==
During the trial, one of the victims accused Rapraeger of giving her a negative result in December 2009. Two months later, she discovered that she had breast cancer. Rachael's defense attorney, Floyd Buford, have argued that the court had only one copy of the negative mammograms, which might make his defense harder. During the same trial another woman, named Miriam Mizell, said that she had to do chemotherapy twice as a result of her initial misdiagnosis; the diagnosis Rapraeger said was negative.

== Conviction ==
Rapraeger initially pleaded not guilty, but later accepted a deal in which she pleaded guilty to 10 counts of misdemeanor reckless conduct and one count of felony computer forgery.

In April of 2014, Judge Katherine Lumsden sentenced her to up to six months in prison. She also received 10 years of probation and a $12,500 fine, and won’t be allowed to hold any job in the health care field for 10 years.
