= Computer trespass =

Computer crime involving unlawful access to computers

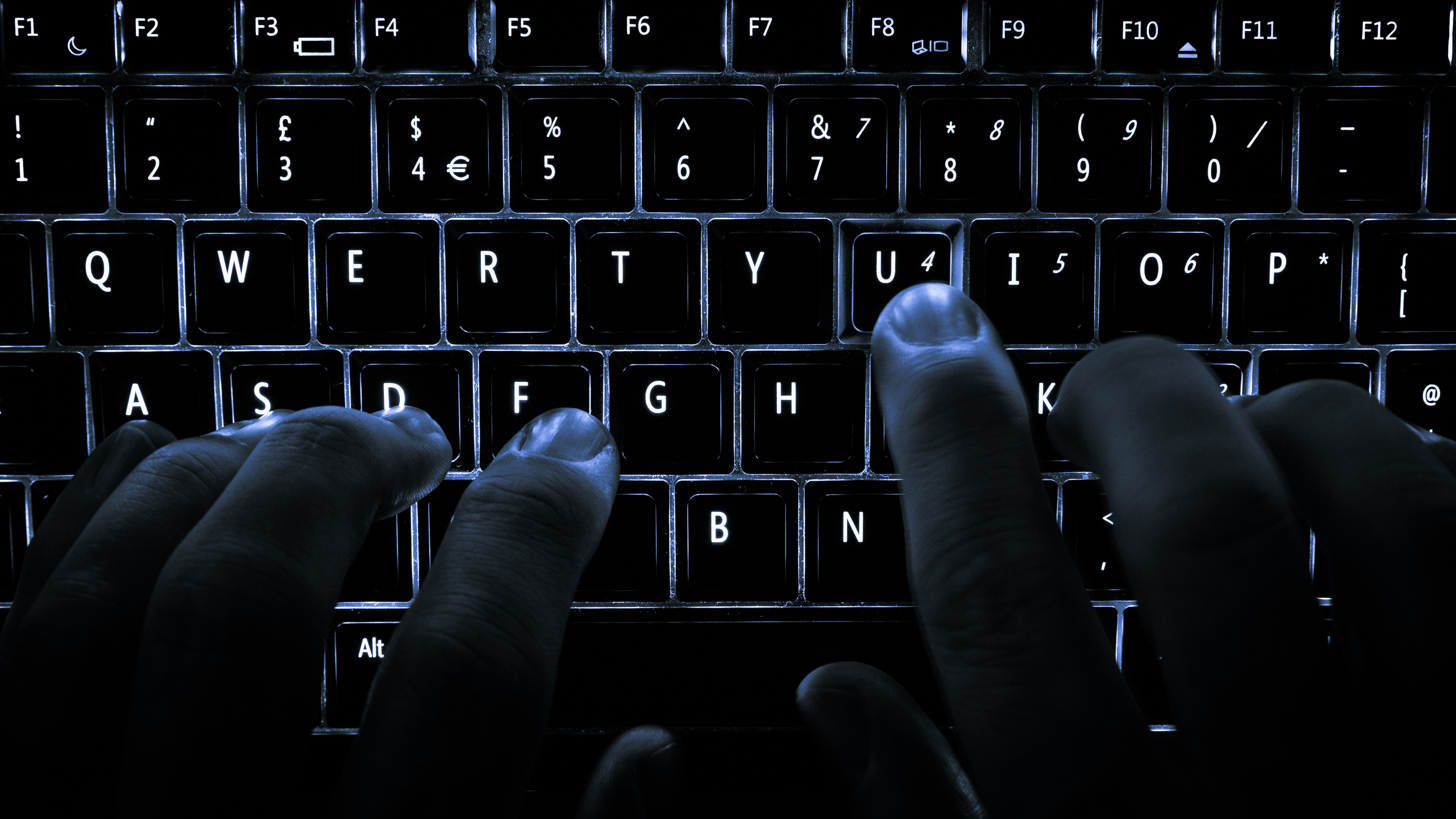
Computer trespassing is very similar to hacking.

Computer trespass is a computer crime in the United States involving unlawful access to computers. It is defined under the Computer Fraud and Abuse Act. (U.S.C 18 § 1030)

== Definition ==
A computer trespass is defined as accessing a computer without proper authorization and gaining financial information, information from a department or agency from any protected computer. Each state has its own laws regarding computer trespassing but they all echo the federal act in some manner.

== Examples of state legislation ==
=== New York ===
To be found guilty of computer trespass in New York one must knowingly use a computer, computer service, or computer network without authorization and commit (or attempt) some further crime.

§ 156.10 Computer trespass.

A person is guilty of computer trespass when he or she knowingly uses, causes to be used, or accesses a computer, computer service, or computer network without authorization and:
1. he or she does so with an intent to commit or attempt to commit or further the commission of any felony; or
2. he or she thereby knowingly gains access to computer material.
Computer trespass is a class E felony.

=== Ohio ===
(A) No person shall knowingly use or operate the property of another without the consent of the owner or person authorized to give consent.

(B) No person, in any manner and by any means, including, but not limited to, computer hacking, shall knowingly gain access to, attempt to gain access to, or cause access to be gained to any computer, computer system, computer network, cable service, cable system, telecommunications device, telecommunications service, or information service without the consent of, or beyond the scope of the express or implied consent of, the owner of the computer, computer system, computer network, cable service, cable system, telecommunications device, telecommunications service, or information service or other person authorized to give consent.

== Punishment ==
Under federal law, the punishment for committing a computer trespass is imprisonment for no more than 10 or 20 years, depending on the severity of the crime committed. (subsection (a) (b) (c) (1) (A) (B))

== Criticism of the Computer Fraud and Abuse act ==
Years after the CFAA was put into law, many have become uncomfortable with the law's language because of the drastic difference between today's technology and the technology of the 1980s. Legal scholars such as Orin Kerr and Tiffany Curtis have expressed such concerns. In one of Curtis's essays, "Computer Fraud and Abuse Act Enforcement: Cruel, Unusual, and Due for Reform." She expresses how, with the passage of time, the CFAA becomes a more cruel law with the current language used in the act. She then suggests that the United States Congress should take the act into review and refer it to the Eighth Amendment to update the language to better fit modern law and society. Kerr wrote in his essay, "Trespass, Not Fraud: The Need for New Sentencing Guidelines in CFAA Cases," that since the language is so vague in the act, you could be punished in a way that doesn't reflect the crime you committed. He stresses how the language stresses the financial fraud language more than any other part in the law, leaving the rest vague in meaning.

== Notable computer breaches ==
- 2013 Yahoo! data breach
- 2014 eBay data breach
- 2013 Target data breach
- 2017 Equifax data breach

== See also ==
- Computer Fraud and Abuse Act
- Computer security
- Cybercrime
- List of data breaches
- National Information Infrastructure Protection Act
