= Pulte Homes, Inc. v. Laborers' International Union =

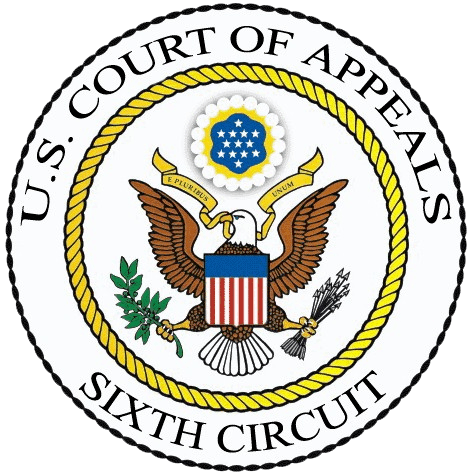
- Court: United States Court of Appeals for the Sixth Circuit
- Full case name: Pulte Homes, Inc. v. Labors International Union of North America, et al.
- Argued: December 9, 2010
- Decided: August 2, 2011
- Citation: 648 F.3d 295

Court membership
- Judges sitting: Danny Julian Boggs, Deborah L. Cook, James G. Carr (N.D. Ohio)

Case opinions
- Majority: Cook, joined by a unanimous court

Laws applied
- CFAA

Keywords
- cyberlaw·computer fraud

Pulte Homes, Inc. v. Laborers' International Union of North America, 648 F.3d 295 (6th Cir. 2011), is a Sixth Circuit Court of Appeals case that reinstated a Computer Fraud and Abuse Act ("CFAA") claim brought by an employer against a labor union for "bombarding" the company's phone and computer systems with emails and voicemail, making it impossible for the company to communicate with customers. It held that causing a transmission that diminishes a plaintiff's ability to use its systems and data constitutes "causing damage" in violation of the CFAA.

== Background ==
=== CFAA ===
The Federal Computer Fraud and Abuse Act (CFAA), 18 U.S.C. § 1030, is a statute that both criminalizes certain computer-fraud crimes and creates a civil cause of action. Enacted in 1986, the CFAA makes it a crime to "knowingly cause the transmission of a program, information, code, or command, and as a result of that conduct, intentionally cause damage without authorization, to a protected computer." Under the CFAA, "any impairment to the integrity or availability of data, a program, a system, or information" qualifies as "damage."

== Case ==
=== Facts & Procedural Posture ===
In September 2009, Pulte, a home building company, fired a construction crew member for what they claimed was misconduct and poor performance. Soon afterward, the Laborers' International Union of North America (LIUNA) initiated a national campaign against Pulte in order to damage its reputation because they thought union membership was the company's real reason. The union's tactics included bombarding Pulte's sales offices and three of its executives with thousands of phone calls and emails. Most of the communications concerned the company's purported unfair labor practices, though some included threats and obscene language. The volume of calls overloaded Pulte's system, interfering with employees' normal communications with customers and vendors and generally stalling normal business operations.

Pulte filed suit, alleging violations of the CFAA. The district court denied the motion, holding that Pulte failed to show that LIUNA intentionally caused damage to Pulte's phone and computer systems. Pulte appealed.

=== Sixth Circuit Opinion ===
The Sixth Circuit held that Pulte had successfully stated a "transmission" claim. A transmission claim requires a showing that the defendant intentionally caused damage. The court stated that "a transmission that weakens a sound computer system—or, similarly, one that diminishes a plaintiff's ability to use data or a system—causes damage." It reasoned that LIUNA's barrage of calls and emails diminished Pulte's ability to use its systems and data because they prevented Pulte from sending and receiving at least some emails and calls.

The court further held that Pulte met its burden in showing that LIUNA acted with the intent to cause damage, holding that the district court had set too high of a standard as to this element. LIUNA did not need to know the actual consequences of its actions, the court reasoned; the sheer volume of calls and LIUNA's call to "fight back" indicated that the union intended to cause some harm to Pulte.

The Sixth Circuit agreed with the lower court that Pulte failed to allege an "access" claim. To state an access claim, a plaintiff must show that the defendant "intentionally accesse[d] a protected computer without authorization." A person acting "without authorization" has "no rights, limited or otherwise, to access the computer in question." The court reasoned that Pulte's phone and email systems were open to the public, so LIUNA was authorized to use them. Because Pulte did not allege that LIUNA possessed no right to contact Pulte's offices and its executives, it failed to satisfy this element of its claim.

== Significance ==
This case reflects the recent trend of federal appeals courts expanding the CFAA beyond its original purpose of combating computer hacking. District courts have historically interpreted the CFAA narrowly, sometimes limiting it strictly to outside computer hacking. In contrast, appeals courts have continued to interpret the statute broadly as a true federal omnibus computer crime statute, capturing a wide range of activity directed at computers and computer systems.

Critics of the decision have argued that in raising emails sent as part of a labor protest to the level of "computer hacking," the court stretched too far. Moreover, they have argued that the rule established in the case is overly broad. By holding that diminished ability to use a phone or email system constitutes damage, the Sixth Circuit has left open the possibility that coordinated phone or email campaigns – common tools of civic action – will be subject to liability under the CFAA.
