= United States v. John =

United States v. John may refer to the following legal cases:

- United States v. John (1978), 437 U.S. 634 (1978), on state jurisdiction relating to Indian reservations
- United States v. John (2010), 597 F.3d 263 (5th Cir. 1983), interpreting the Computer Fraud and Abuse Act
