= HiQ Labs v. LinkedIn =

2019 United States court case

hiQ Labs, Inc. v. LinkedIn Corp
- Court: United States Court of Appeals for the Ninth Circuit
- Decided: 9 September 2019
- Citation: 938 F.3d 985

Case history
- Prior action: 273 F. Supp. 3d 1099 (N.D. Cal. 2017)
- Subsequent actions: Cert. granted, judgment vacated, 141 S. Ct. 2752, 210 L. Ed. 2d 902 (2021); Adhered to on remand, 31 F.4th 1180 (9th Cir. 2022)

Court membership
- Judges sitting: Marsha Berzon, John Clifford Wallace, Terrence Berg

hiQ Labs, Inc. v. LinkedIn Corp., 938 F.3d 985 (9th Cir. 2019), was a United States Ninth Circuit case about web scraping. hiQ is a small data analytics company that used automated bots to scrape information from public LinkedIn profiles. LinkedIn used legal means to prevent this. hiQ Labs brought a case against LinkedIn in a district court, seeking an injunction against these means, which was granted. LinkedIn appealed. The 9th Circuit affirmed the district court's preliminary injunction, preventing LinkedIn from denying the plaintiff, hiQ Labs, from accessing LinkedIn's publicly available LinkedIn member profiles. However, after further appeal in another court, hiQ was found to be in breach of LinkedIn's terms, and there was a settlement.

The 9th Circuit ruled that hiQ had the right to do web scraping. However, the Supreme Court, based on its Van Buren v. United States decision, vacated the decision and remanded the case for further review in June 2021. In a second ruling in April 2022 the Ninth Circuit affirmed its decision. In November 2022 the U.S. District Court for the Northern District of California ruled that hiQ had breached LinkedIn's User Agreement and a settlement agreement was reached between the two parties.

== Background ==
LinkedIn served hiQ with a cease-and-desist, demanding that hiQ cease its activity of accessing and copying data from LinkedIn's server. hiQ filed suit against LinkedIn, seeking both injunctive relief under California law and a declaratory judgment to prevent LinkedIn from lawfully invoking the Computer Fraud and Abuse Act (CFAA), the Digital Millennium Copyright Act (DMCA), California Penal Code § 502(c), or the common law of trespass against hiQ.

== Ninth Circuit ==
The Ninth Circuit affirmed the district court's award of a preliminary injunction in hiQ's favor, finding that "hiQ established a likelihood of irreparable harm because the survival of its business was threatened."

The Ninth Circuit held that there was no abuse of discretion by the district court where the court had found that even if some LinkedIn users retained their privacy despite their public status, as they were not scraped, such privacy interests did not outweigh hiQ's interest in maintaining its business.

In balancing the hardships, the Ninth Circuit determined it weighed in favor of hiQ. Further, the Ninth Circuit noted that hiQ posed serious concerns with regards to "(1) the merits of its claim for tortious interference with contract, alleging that LinkedIn intentionally interfered with its contracts with third parties, and (2) the merits of LinkedIn’s legitimate business purpose defense."

Additionally, there was a serious contention as to whether the CFAA preempted hiQ's state law causes of action, specifically because the CFAA prohibits accessing a computer without authorization or exceeding one's authorization to obtain information from a protected computer. LinkedIn asserted that following the receipt of its cease-and-desist letter, hiQ's scraping and further use of its data without authorization fell within the meaning of "without authorization" within the CFAA.

The Ninth Circuit affirmed the district court's finding that public interest favored the granting of a preliminary injunction. In his concurring opinion, Judge Wallace specified his concern about the appeal of a preliminary injunction initiated in order to obtain an appellate court's take on the merits.

Ultimately, the Ninth Circuit's affirmation of the district court's grant of the preliminary injunction prohibited LinkedIn from denying hiQ access to publicly available data on public LinkedIn users' profiles.

== Supreme Court ==
LinkedIn petitioned the Supreme Court to review the Ninth Circuit's decision. In an order on June 14, 2021, the Supreme Court vacated the Ninth Circuit's decision on the basis of their ruling on CFAA the week prior in Van Buren v. United States, which had ruled that the "exceeds authorized access" of CFAA only applies when an individual has valid access to a system but accesses parts of a system they are not intended to access. The case was remanded to the Ninth Circuit for further review under Van Buren.

In a second ruling in April 2022 the Ninth Circuit affirmed its decision.
