= RadPad =

Mobile app for renters

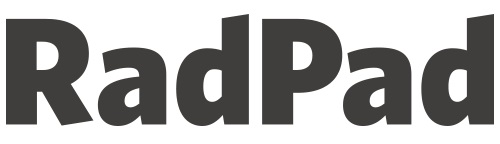
- Genre: Mobile app, real estate, apartments, rent payments
- Founded: January 2013
- Defunct: January 2021
- Headquarters: Dallas
- Key people: Copley Broer (CEO)
- Website: onradpad.com

RadPad was a photo-based mobile application for home and apartment renters. RadPad's assets were acquired by the owners of LandlordStation on December 31, 2016. As of October 2016, renters could no longer pay rent through the app. Pay With RadPad, however, was relaunched under new ownership in March 2017. In March 2014, RadPad was the largest rental service in Los Angeles, and the second-largest rental market in the country. RadPad also offered additional real estate products such as renters insurance, credit reporting, and lease signing. Operations ceased in 2021.

== History ==
Jonathan Eppers, Tyler Galpin and Tim Watson founded RadPad in 2012 after attempting to find an apartment in Los Angeles proved to be a terrible experience. Development began in July 2012 in Venice, California, and was released to friends on Facebook in October. In January 2013, RadPad had reached over 10,000 downloads and was invited to join the startup accelerator Amplify.LA.

In mid-2013, RadPad had raised over $800,000 in seed funding led by Deep Fork Capital, one of the first investors in Trulia. RadPad announced in March 2014 that it had raised an additional $1 million in capital. RadPad closed its seed funding in August 2014 with an additional $2 million investment round. RadPad had raised approximately $4 million in seed funding with the investor team including Michael Huffington, Mike Jones, Justin Fishner-Wolfson, Brian Lee, Tom McInerney, Nasir "Nas" Jones, Happy Walters (Co-President of Relativity Media), Deep Fork Capital, Post Investments, SG Acquisitions, Social Leverage, Siemer Ventures, and Queensbridge Venture Partners.

It was also announced in August 2014 that RadPad had declined multiple acquisition offers.

In April 2015, RadPad raised an additional $9M in Series A Funding. In December 2016, Radpad's assets were acquired by the ownership of LandlordStation. RadPad and LandlordStation operated under the umbrella of Priority Real Estate Technology.

Founders

- Jonathan Eppers – CEO and co-founder
- Tyler Galpin – Head of Design and co-founder
- Tim Watson – CTO and co-founder

=== LandlordStation acquires RadPad ===
In December 2016, RadPad was purchased for an undisclosed price by LandlordStation and its headquarters were moved to Dallas, Texas. Pay with RadPad was brought back online in March 2017. RadPad began offering locating services as an additional product in September 2017 in Dallas and later in 2018 in Houston.

=== Acquisition and creation of Priority Real Estate Technology ===
In August 2018, RadPad and LandlordStation were acquired by Priority Technology Holdings and spun into a privately held subsidiary, Priority Real Estate Technology (PRET). PRET sought to expand and accelerate the in-house RadPad and LandlordStation brands while forming partnerships and making strategic acquisitions across the real estate technology space. RadPad operated separately as its own real estate lifestyle brand with the same product offerings for consumers and landlords alike.

On December 16, 2020, RadPad announced operations would cease as of January 15, 2021.

== Features ==
=== Listing photos and videos ===
Each property listing must have at least three listing photos. Property owners can also upload videos for a virtual tour.

=== Verified listings ===
RadPad requires that property owners confirm their identities via a two-step authentication process that verifies their phone number and requires them to upload a valid, state-issued photo ID. RadPad also requires property owners to renew their listings every two weeks to keep them current.

=== Location-based search ===
RadPad automatically populates available apartments, condos, and homes based on where the renter opens the app. Renters can walk or drive through their desired neighborhood and see listings in real time.

== Products ==
- Browse & Search

RadPad launched in 2012 with Browse & Search, enabling renters to scroll through geo and photo-based listings using an iPhone app or mobile browser.

- Pay with RadPad

Launched in 2014, renters can pay their rent one-time or schedule their rent with their credit cards, debit cards, or ACH. Landlords will receive their monthly payments via mailed check or ACH bank transfer. This service was relaunched under new ownership in March 2017.

- List with RadPad

Property owners, landlords, property management firms, brokers and other real estate professionals can list available properties, manage listings and syndicate them to RadPad partners.

- RadPad Locating

Launched in September 2017, RadPad offers apartment locating services in Dallas and Houston. Agents run customized searches for clients to find the right apartment and lower prices through knowledge of promotions and specials.

== User demographic information ==
Most RadPad users were in college or under the age of 35. Two-thirds of users were female.

== Controversy ==
In 2013, Westside Rentals filed suit against RadPad alleging that they had improperly used Westside Rentals’ brand name by advertising that any apartment listed through RadPad would be automatically listed on Westside Rental's website. The suit was dropped by Westside Rentals later that year.

Craigslist vs Radpad

In 2017, USSC found against Radpad in a lawsuit brought by Craigslist in excess of $60M damages were awarded.
