= Van Buren v. United States =

- Supreme Court of the United States

Argued November 30, 2020 Decided June 3, 2021
- Full case name: Nathan Van Buren v. United States
- Docket no.: 19-783
- Citations: 593 U.S. 374 (more) 141 S. Ct. 1648, 210 L. Ed. 2d 26

Case history
- Prior: Conviction, United States v. Van Buren, No. 1:16-cr-00243 (N.D. Ga. May 3, 2018); Affirmed, 940 F.3d 1192 (11th Cir. 2019); Cert. granted, Van Buren v. United States, 206 L. Ed. 2d 822 (2020)

Holding
- An individual "exceeds authorized access" when he accesses a computer with authorization but then obtains information located in particular areas of the computer—such as files, folders, or databases—that are off-limits to him.

Court membership
- Chief Justice John Roberts Associate Justices Clarence Thomas · Stephen Breyer; Samuel Alito · Sonia Sotomayor; Elena Kagan · Neil Gorsuch; Brett Kavanaugh · Amy Coney Barrett

Case opinions
- Majority: Barrett, joined by Breyer, Sotomayor, Kagan, Gorsuch, Kavanaugh
- Dissent: Thomas, joined by Roberts, Alito

Laws applied
- Computer Fraud and Abuse Act

Van Buren v. United States, 593 U.S. 374 (2021), was a United States Supreme Court case dealing with the Computer Fraud and Abuse Act (CFAA) and its definition of "exceeds authorized access" in relation to one intentionally accessing a computer system they have authorization to access. In June 2021, the Supreme Court ruled in a 6–3 opinion that one "exceeds authorized access" by accessing off-limit files and other information on a computer system they were otherwise authorized to access. The CFAA's language had long created a 4–3 circuit split in case law that led to the failed introduction of Aaron's Law, and this decision narrowed the applicability of CFAA in prosecuting cybersecurity and computer crime.

== Background ==
The Computer Fraud and Abuse Act (CFAA) is a federal law passed in 1986 to strengthen laws around unauthorized access to computer systems. Among its core statutes at 18 U.S.C. § 1030(a)(2) is that intentionally accessing a computer system "without authorization or exceeds authorized access" to obtain protected information, financial records, or federal government information is considered a federal crime that can include fines and imprisonment as a penalty.

The exact definition of "exceeds authorized access" is not clear and created a 4–3 circuit split of cases at the Circuit Courts. In the First, Fifth, Seventh, and Eleventh Circuits, the courts upheld a broad view of the statement, that accessing a computer with authorization but for an improper purpose is a violation of the CFAA. The Second, Fourth, and Ninth Circuits took a more narrow view that a violation only occurs if the authorized user accesses information they were prohibited from accessing.

Because of the case law split, there has been debate on whether the language should be treated narrowly or broadly between cybersecurity researchers and law enforcement among others. For cybersecurity practitioners, a narrow interpretation of "exceeds authorized access" language in §1030(a)(2) would allow them to better conduct work identifying and resolving security problems with computer hardware and software as to make the Internet safer. The vagueness of the statute otherwise puts these job functions at risk. Law enforcement and the U.S. government in general prefer a broader interpretation as this allows them to prosecute those who use hacking to bring down or take advantage of insecure systems under the CFAA. There are additional concerns as the language of CFAA, if broadly interpreted, could apply to commonly accepted activities at businesses or elsewhere, such as using office computers for browsing the web. Jeffrey L. Fisher, a law professor at Stanford University who represents the petitioner in the present case, states that the law's language is outdated with modern computer usage, and its broad interpretation "[makes] a crime out of ordinary breaches of computer restrictions and terms of service that people likely don’t even know about and if they did would have no reason to think would be a federal crime."

== Facts of the case ==
Police officer Nathan Van Buren, from Cumming, Georgia, was in need of money and asked a man, Andrew Albo, for help. Albo was known to have connections to prostitution in the town and had prior conflicts with the police. Albo reported this request to the local sheriff's office, where the request was passed to the Federal Bureau of Investigation (FBI). The FBI set up a sting operation and instructed Albo to offer Van Buren US$6,000, but in exchange, to request Van Buren look up a license plate on the Georgia Crime Information Center (GCIC) he had authorized access to, as to see if its registered owner, a stripper, was an undercover officer. Van Buren complied with the request, which led the FBI to arrest him for felony computer fraud under the CFAA §1030(a)(2). Van Buren was found guilty in a jury trial and sentenced to 18 months of prison by the United States District Court for the Northern District of Georgia.

Van Buren appealed the conviction to the United States Court of Appeals for the Eleventh Circuit, asserting that accessing the GCIC that he had authorized access to but for an improper purpose was not a violation of the "exceeds authorized access" clause of the CFAA. While the Circuit judges had some sympathy for this argument, they chose to rule on precedent from a prior Eleventh Circuit case, United States v. Rodriguez (2010), to uphold Van Buren's conviction.

== Supreme Court ==
Van Buren petitioned to the Supreme Court, which granted certiorari in April 2020. The case was argued on November 30, 2020, via telephone due to the COVID-19 pandemic.

The Court issued its decision on June 3, 2021. In a 6–3 decision, the Court reversed and remanded the lower court ruling. The majority opinion was written by Justice Amy Coney Barrett, joined by Justices Stephen Breyer, Sonia Sotomayor, Elena Kagan, Neil Gorsuch, and Brett Kavanaugh. Barrett ruled that for the CFAA, a person violates the "exceeds authorized access" language when they access files or other information that is off-limits to them on a computer system that they otherwise have authorized access to. The majority opinion distinguished this from Van Buren's case, in that the information that he obtained was within the limits of what he could access with his authorization, but was done for improper reasons, and thus he could not be charged under CFAA for this crime. In the opinion Barrett agreed with critics of the law that if they had taken the government's stance that "the 'exceeds authorized access' clause criminalizes every violation of a computer-use policy", "then millions of otherwise law-abiding citizens are criminals."

Justice Clarence Thomas wrote the dissenting opinion joined by Chief Justice John Roberts and Justice Samuel Alito. Thomas wrote that many parts of federal law denote portions of law where a person may be given temporary access to property but still places limits on what they may do with that access, such as a valet parking a car, and that the majority had taken a contrived position. Thomas wrote "It is understandable to be uncomfortable with so much conduct being criminalized, but that discomfort does not give us authority to alter statutes."

This case is notable for being the first in which Justice Stephen Breyer assigned the majority opinion. Because the Chief Justice and Justice Thomas both dissented, Breyer, who is the second-most senior Associate Justice, was the most senior justice in the majority and so assigned the opinion. Breyer chose to assign this opinion to Justice Barrett, who was the newest justice at the time.

== Reactions ==
The Electronic Frontier Foundation, which had filed an amicus brief in the case stating that "the CFAA has hindered [the] work [of 'security researchers']" and opined that "the government’s broad interpretation of the CFAA" meant that "standard security research practices ... can be highly risky", called the ruling "a victory for all Internet users" and "especially good news for security researchers".

== Impact ==
The following week, on the basis of Van Buren, the Supreme Court vacated the Ninth Circuit's decision in hiQ Labs v. LinkedIn (2019) via order, in which hiQ had prevailed to be able to web scrape data from LinkedIn, which is owned by Microsoft. The Ninth Circuit had relied on the interpretation of CFAA that as LinkedIn's data was publicly available, Microsoft could not stop hiQ from collecting it even at a massive scale beyond the capabilities of a human. The Supreme Court vacated the ruling and instructed the Ninth Circuit to review the case under the Van Buren decision, which could incorporate web scraping as an improper act under CFAA within the Supreme Court's ruling.
