= PayPal 14 =

Refers to a group of hackers tried for launching a DOS attack against PayPal

The PayPal 14 are a group of defendants allegedly connected with the hacktivist group Anonymous, thirteen of whom pleaded guilty in a San Jose court in California, United States in December 2013, to charges of conspiring to disrupt access to the PayPal payment service. The attempted four-day disruption of PayPal's operations was allegedly in response to PayPal's refusal to process donations to Wau Holland Stiftung's PayPal account set up to collect funds for WikiLeaks, and was part of a wider Anonymous campaign, Operation Payback.

== Court proceedings ==
The defendants were charged under the Computer Fraud and Abuse Act in July 2011 for the attempted denial of service attacks, which occurred in December 2010. On December 5, 2013, ten of the defendants pleaded guilty to one misdemeanor count of damaging a protected computer and one felony count of conspiracy, and three others each pleaded guilty to one misdemeanor. The 14th defendant had their case handled separately.

New York-based attorney Stanley Cohen, who represented one of the defendants, claimed that the 13 committed acts of civil disobedience in political dissent, adding that he thinks that the acts were free speech protected by the First Amendment. In an interview for SKP News Cohen compared the digital 'sit-in' to protests organized by the civil rights movement. Cohen further noted that the guilty pleas were for misdemeanors resulting in probation, instead of having the defendants face possible felony convictions and jail sentences. A fine of $86,000 was equally distributed among the 13 activists, each owing $6,615.

== Leniency request ==
It is unclear how many people actually took part in the attacks. Pierre Omidyar, founder of the online market eBay, asked federal prosecutors to show leniency, stating that "[i]n those cases, I believe justice requires leniency. In my view, they should be facing misdemeanor charges and the possibility of a fine, rather than felony charges and jail time."
