= Computer fraud =

Use of computers to defraud

Computer fraud is the use of computers, the Internet, Internet devices, and Internet services to defraud people or organizations of resources. In the United States, computer fraud is specifically proscribed by the Computer Fraud and Abuse Act (CFAA), which criminalizes computer-related acts under federal jurisdiction and directly combats the insufficiencies of existing laws. Types of computer fraud include:

- Distributing hoax emails
- Accessing unauthorized computers
- Engaging in data mining via spyware and malware
- Hacking into computer systems to illegally access personal information, such as credit cards or Social Security numbers
- Sending computer viruses or worms with the intent to destroy or ruin another party's computer or system.

Phishing, social engineering, viruses, and DDoS attacks are fairly well-known tactics used to disrupt service or gain access to another's network, but this list is not inclusive.

== Notable incidents ==
The Melissa Virus/Worm

The Melissa Virus appeared on thousands of email systems on March 26, 1999. It was disguised in each instance as an important message from a colleague or friend. The virus was designed to send an infected email to the first 50 email addresses on the users’ Microsoft Outlook address book. Each infected computer would infect 50 additional computers, which in turn would infect another 50 computers. The virus proliferated rapidly and exponentially, resulting in substantial interruption and impairment of public communications and services. Many system administrators had to disconnect their computer systems from the Internet. Companies such as Microsoft, Intel, Lockheed Martin and Lucent Technologies were forced to shut down their email gateways due to the vast amount of emails the virus was generating. The Melissa virus is the most costly outbreak to date, causing more than $400 million in damages to North American businesses.

After an investigation conducted by multiple branches of government and law enforcement, the Melissa Virus/Worm was attributed to David L. Smith, a 32-year-old New Jersey programmer, who was eventually charged with computer fraud. Smith was one of the first people ever to be prosecuted for the act of writing a virus. He was sentenced to 20 months in federal prison and was fined $5,000. In addition, he was also ordered to serve three years of supervised release after completion of his prison sentence. The investigation involved members of New Jersey State Police High Technology Crime Unit, the Federal Bureau of Investigation (FBI), the Justice Department's Computer Crime and Intellectual Property Section, and the Defense Criminal Investigative Service.

== See also ==
- Cybercrime
- Information security
- Information technology audit
- Internet fraud
