= Computer Fraud and Abuse Act =

1986 United States cybersecurity law

- Other short titles: Computer Fraud and Abuse Act of 1986
- Long title: A bill to amend title 18, United States Code, to provide additional penalties for fraud and related activities in connection with access devices and computers, and for other purposes.
- Acronyms (colloquial): CFAA
- Enacted by: the 99th United States Congress

Citations
- Public law: Pub. L. 99–474
- Statutes at Large: 100 Stat. 1213

Codification
- Acts amended: Counterfeit Access Device and Computer Fraud and Abuse Act of 1984
- Titles amended: Title 18 of the United States Code: Crimes and Criminal Procedure
- U.S.C. sections amended: 18 U.S.C. § 1030

Legislative history
- Introduced in the House as H.R. 4718 by William J. Hughes (D–NJ) on April 30, 1986; Committee consideration by House Committee on the Judiciary; Passed the House on June 3, 1986 (Voice vote); Passed the Senate on October 3, 1986 (Voice vote); Agreed to by the House as amended on October 6, 1986 (Unanimous consent); Signed into law by President Ronald Reagan on October 16, 1986

Major amendments
- USA PATRIOT Act

United States Supreme Court cases
- Van Buren v. United States, No. 19-783, 593 U.S. ___ (2021)

The Computer Fraud and Abuse Act of 1986 (CFAA) is a United States cybersecurity bill that was enacted in 1986 as an amendment to existing computer fraud law (18 U.S.C. § 1030), which had been included in the Comprehensive Crime Control Act of 1984. Prior to computer-specific criminal laws, computer crimes were prosecuted as mail and wire fraud, but the applying law was often insufficient.

The original 1984 bill was enacted in response to concern that computer-related crimes might go unpunished. The House Committee Report to the original computer crime bill included a statement by a representative of GTE-owned Telenet that characterized the 1983 techno-thriller film WarGames—in which a young teenager (played by Matthew Broderick) from Seattle breaks into a U.S. military supercomputer programmed to predict possible outcomes of nuclear war and unwittingly almost starts World War III—as "a realistic representation of the automatic dialing and access capabilities of the personal computer."

The CFAA was written to extend existing tort law to intangible property, while, in theory, limiting federal jurisdiction to cases "with a compelling federal interest—i.e., where computers of the federal government or certain financial institutions are involved or where the crime itself is interstate in nature", but its broad definitions have spilled over into contract law (see "Protected Computer", below). In addition to amending a number of the provisions in the original section 1030, the CFAA also criminalized additional computer-related acts. Provisions addressed the distribution of malicious code and denial-of-service attacks. Congress also included in the CFAA a provision criminalizing trafficking in passwords and similar items.

Since then, the Act has been amended a number of times—in 1989, 1994, 1996, in 2001 by the USA PATRIOT Act, 2002, and in 2008 by the Identity Theft Enforcement and Restitution Act. With each amendment of the law, the types of conduct that fell within its reach were extended. In 2015, President Barack Obama proposed expanding the CFAA and the RICO Act. DEF CON organizer and Cloudflare researcher Marc Rogers, Senator Ron Wyden, and Representative Zoe Lofgren stated opposition to this on the grounds it would make many regular internet activities illegal. In 2021, the Supreme Court ruled in Van Buren v. United States to provide a narrow interpretation of the meaning of "exceeds authorized access".

== Protected computers ==
The only computers, in theory, covered by the CFAA are defined as "protected computers". They are defined under section 18 U.S.C. § 1030(e)(2) to mean a computer:

- exclusively for the use of a financial institution or the United States Government, or any computer, when the conduct constituting the offense affects the computer's use by or for the financial institution or the government; or
- which is used in or affecting interstate or foreign commerce or communication, including a computer located outside the United States that is used in a manner that affects interstate or foreign commerce or communication of the United States ...

In practice, any ordinary computer has come under the jurisdiction of the law, including cellphones, due to the interstate nature of most Internet communication.

== Criminal offenses under the Act ==
(a) Whoever—

(1) having knowingly accessed a computer without authorization or exceeding authorized access, and by means of such conduct having obtained information that has been determined by the United States Government pursuant to an Executive order or statute to require protection against unauthorized disclosure for reasons of national defense or foreign relations, or any restricted data, as defined in paragraph y. of section 11 of the Atomic Energy Act of 1954, with reason to believe that such information so obtained could be used to the injury of the United States, or to the advantage of any foreign nation willfully communicates, delivers, transmits, or causes to be communicated, delivered, or transmitted, or attempts to communicate, deliver, transmit or cause to be communicated, delivered, or transmitted the same to any person not entitled to receive it, or willfully retains the same and fails to deliver it to the officer or employee of the United States entitled to receive it;
(2) intentionally accesses a computer without authorization or exceeds authorized access, and thereby obtains—

(A) information contained in a financial record of a financial institution, or of a card issuer as defined in section 1602 (n) [1] of title 15, or contained in a file of a consumer reporting agency on a consumer, as such terms are defined in the Fair Credit Reporting Act (15 U.S.C. 1681 et seq.);
(B) information from any department or agency of the United States; or
(C) information from any protected computer;

(3) intentionally, without authorization to access any nonpublic computer of a department or agency of the United States, accesses such a computer of that department or agency that is exclusively for the use of the Government of the United States or, in the case of a computer not exclusively for such use, is used by or for the Government of the United States and such conduct affects that use by or for the Government of the United States;
(4) knowingly and with intent to defraud, accesses a protected computer without authorization, or exceeds authorized access, and by means of such conduct furthers the intended fraud and obtains anything of value, unless the object of the fraud and the thing obtained consists only of the use of the computer and the value of such use is not more than $5,000 in any 1-year period;
(5)

(A) knowingly causes the transmission of a program, information, code, or command, and as a result of such conduct, intentionally causes damage without authorization, to a protected computer;
(B) intentionally accesses a protected computer without authorization, and as a result of such conduct, recklessly causes damage; or
(C) intentionally accesses a protected computer without authorization, and as a result of such conduct, causes damage and loss.

(6) knowingly and with intent to defraud traffics (as defined in section 1029) in any password or similar information through which a computer may be accessed without authorization, if—

(A) such trafficking affects interstate or foreign commerce; or
(B) such computer is used by or for the Government of the United States;

(7) with intent to extort from any person any money or other thing of value, transmits in interstate or foreign commerce any communication containing any—

(A) threat to cause damage to a protected computer;
(B) threat to obtain information from a protected computer without authorization or in excess of authorization or to impair the confidentiality of information obtained from a protected computer without authorization or by exceeding authorized access; or
(C) demand or request for money or other thing of value in relation to damage to a protected computer, where such damage was caused to facilitate the extortion

== Specific sections ==
- 18 U.S.C. § 1030(a)(1): Computer espionage. This section takes much of its language from the Espionage Act of 1917, with the notable addition being that it also covers information related to "Foreign Relations", not simply "National Defense" like the Espionage Act.
- 18 U.S.C. § 1030(a)(2): Computer trespassing, and taking government, financial, or commerce info
- 18 U.S.C. § 1030(a)(3): Computer trespassing in a government computer
- 18 U.S.C. § 1030(a)(4): Committing fraud with computer
- 18 U.S.C. § 1030(a)(5): Damaging a protected computer (including viruses, worms)
- 18 U.S.C. § 1030(a)(6): Trafficking in passwords of a government or commerce computer
- 18 U.S.C. § 1030(a)(7): Threatening to damage a protected computer
- 18 U.S.C. § 1030(b): Conspiracy to violate (a)
- 18 U.S.C. § 1030(c): Penalties
- 18 U.S.C. § 1030(f): Investigative, protective, and intelligence activities

== Notable cases and decisions referring to the Act ==
The Computer Fraud and Abuse Act is both a criminal law and a statute that creates a private right of action, allowing compensation and injunctive or other equitable relief to anyone harmed by a violation of this law. These provisions have allowed private companies to sue disloyal employees for damages for the misappropriation of confidential information (trade secrets).

=== Criminal cases ===
- United States v. Morris (1991), 928 F.2d 504 (2d Cir. 1991), decided March 7, 1991. After the release of the Morris worm, an early computer worm, its creator was convicted under the Act for causing damage and gaining unauthorized access to "federal interest" computers. The Act was amended in 1996, in part, to clarify language whose meaning was disputed in the case.
- United States v. Lori Drew, 259 F.R.D. 449 (C.D. Cal. 2009). The cyberbullying case involving the suicide of a girl harassed on MySpace. Charges were under 18 USC 1030(a)(2)(c) and (b)(2)(c). Judge Wu decided that using 18 U.S.C. § 1030(a)(2)(C) against someone violating a terms of service agreement would make the law overly broad.
- United States v. Rodriguez, 2010. The Eleventh Circuit Court of Appeals ruled that a Social Security Administration employee had violated the CFAA when he used an SSA database to look up information about people he knew personally.
- United States v. Collins et al, 2011. A group of men and women connected to the collective Anonymous signed a plea deal to charges of conspiring to disrupt access to the payment website PayPal in response to the payment shutdown to WikiLeaks over the Wau Holland Foundation which was part of a wider Anonymous campaign, Operation Payback. They later became known under the name PayPal 14.
- United States v. Aaron Swartz, 2011. Aaron Swartz allegedly entered an MIT wiring closet and set up a laptop to mass-download articles from JSTOR. He allegedly avoided various attempts by JSTOR and MIT to stop this, such as MAC address spoofing. He was indicted for violating CFAA provisions (a)(2), (a)(4), (c)(2)(B)(iii), (a)(5)(B), and (c)(4)(A)(i)(I),(VI). The case was dismissed after Swartz committed suicide in January 2013.
- United States v. Nosal, 2011. Nosal and others allegedly accessed a protected computer to take a database of contacts from his previous employer for use in his own business, violating 1030(a)(4). This was a complex case with multiple trips to the Ninth Circuit, which ruled that violating a website's terms of use is not a violation of the CFAA. He was convicted in 2013. In 2016, the Ninth Circuit ruled that he had acted "without authorization" when he used the username and password of a current employee with their consent and affirmed his conviction. The Supreme Court declined to hear the case.
- United States v. Peter Alfred-Adekeye 2011. Adekeye allegedly violated (a)(2), when he allegedly downloaded CISCO IOS, allegedly something that the CISCO employee who gave him an access password did not permit. Adekeye was CEO of Multiven and had accused CISCO of anti-competitive practices.
- United States v Sergey Aleynikov, 2011. Aleynikov was a programmer at Goldman Sachs accused of copying code, like high-frequency trading code, allegedly in violation of 1030(a)(2)(c) and 1030(c)(2)(B)i–iii and 2. This charge was later dropped, and he was instead charged with theft of trade secrets and transporting stolen property.
- United States v Nada Nadim Prouty, c. 2010. Prouty was an FBI and CIA agent who was prosecuted for having a fraudulent marriage to get US residency. She claims she was persecuted by a U.S. attorney who was trying to gain media coverage by calling her a terrorist agent and get himself promoted to a federal judgeship.
- United States v. Neil Scott Kramer, 2011. Kramer was a court case where a cellphone was used to coerce a minor into engaging sex with an adult. Central to the case was whether a cellphone constituted a computer device. Ultimately, the United States Court of Appeals for the Eighth Circuit found that a cell phone can be considered a computer if "the phone perform[s] arithmetic, logical, and storage functions", paving the way for harsher consequences for criminals engaging with minors over cellphones.
- United States v. Kane, 2011. Exploiting a software bug in a poker machine does not constitute hacking because the poker machine in question failed to constitute a "protected computer" under the statute (as the poker machine in question did not demonstrate a tangential relationship to interstate commerce) and because the sequence of button presses that triggered the bug were considered held to have "not exceed[ed] their authorized access." As of November 2013 the defendant still faces a regular wire fraud charge.
- United States v. Valle, 2015. The Second Circuit Court of Appeals overturned a conviction against a police officer who had used a police database to look up information about women he knew personally.
- Van Buren v. United States, 2021. A police officer in Georgia was caught in an FBI sting operation using his authorized access to a license plate database to check the identity of a person for cash payment, an "improper purpose". The officer was convicted and sentenced to 18 months under CFAA §1030(a)(2). Though he appealed his conviction on the basis that the "improper purpose" was not "exceeding authorized access", the Eleventh Circuit upheld the conviction based on precedent. The Supreme Court ruled in June 2021 that under CFAA, that a person "exceeds authorized access" of a computer system they otherwise have access to when they access files and other content that are off-limits to the portions of the computer system they were authorized to access. Their opinion restricted CFAA from applying to cases where a person obtains information from areas they do have authorized access to, but uses that information for improper reasons.

=== Civil cases ===
- Theofel v. Farey Jones, 2003 U.S. App. Lexis 17963, decided August 28, 2003 (U.S. Court of Appeals for the Ninth Circuit), holding that the use of a civil subpoena which is "patently unlawful," "in bad faith," or "at least gross negligence" to gain access to stored email is a breach of both the CFAA and the Stored Communications Act.
- International Airport Centers, L.L.C. v. Citrin, 2006, 18 U.S.C. § 1030(a)(5)(A)(i), in which the Seventh Circuit Court of Appeals ruled that Jacob Citrin had violated the CFAA when he deleted files from his company computer before he quit, in order to conceal alleged bad behavior while he was an employee.
- LVRC Holdings v. Brekka, 2009 1030(a)(2), 1030(a)(4), in which LVRC sued Brekka for allegedly taking information about clients and using it to start his own competing business. The Ninth Circuit ruled that an employee accesses a company computer to gather information for his own purposes does not violate the CFAA merely because that personal use was adverse to the interests of the employer.
- Craigslist v. 3Taps, 2012. 3Taps was accused by Craigslist of breaching CFAA by circumventing an IP block in order to access Craigslist's website and scrape its classified ads without consent. In August 2013, US federal judge found 3Taps's actions violated CFAA and that it faces civil damages for "unauthorized access". Judge Breyer wrote in his decision that "the average person does not use 'anonymous proxies' to bypass an IP block set up to enforce a banning communicated via personally-addressed cease-and-desist letter". He also noted, "Congress apparently knew how to restrict the reach of the CFAA to only certain kinds of information, and it appreciated the public v. nonpublic distinction—but [the relevant section] contains no such restrictions or modifiers."
- Lee v. PMSI, Inc., 2011. PMSI, Inc. sued former employee Lee for violating the CFAA by browsing Facebook and checking personal email in violation of the company's acceptable use policy. The court found that breaching an employer's acceptable use policy was not "unauthorized access" under the act and, therefore, did not violate the CFAA.
- Sony Computer Entertainment America v. George Hotz and Hotz v. SCEA, 2011. SCEA sued "Geohot" and others for jailbreaking the PlayStation 3 system. The lawsuit alleged, among other things, that Hotz violated 18 U.S.C. § 1030(a)(2)(c) ([by] taking info from any protected computer). Hotz denied liability and contested the Court's exercise of personal jurisdiction over him. The parties settled out of court. The settlement caused Geohot to be unable to legally hack the PlayStation 3 system furthermore.
- Pulte Homes, Inc. v. Laborers' International Union 2011. Pulte Homes brought a CFAA suit against the Laborers' International Union of North America (LIUNA). After Pulte fired an employee represented by the union, LIUNA urged members to call and send email to the company, expressing their opinions. As a result of the increased traffic, the company's email system crashed. The Sixth Circuit ruled that the LIUNA's instruction to call and email "intentionally caused damage," reversing the lower court's decision.
- Facebook v. Power Ventures and Vachani, 2016. The Ninth Circuit Court of Appeals ruled that the CFAA was violated when Facebook's servers were accessed despite an IP block and cease and desist order.
- HiQ Labs v. LinkedIn, 2019. The Ninth Circuit Court of Appeals ruled that scraping a public website without the approval of the website's owner is not a violation of the CFAA. LinkedIn petitioned for the Supreme Court to review the decision and the court remanded the case based on its Van Buren v. United States decision. The Ninth Circuit ultimately affirmed its original decision.
- Sandvig v. Barr, 2020. The Federal District Court of D.C. ruled that the CFAA does not criminalize the violation of a website's terms of service.

== Criticism ==
There have been criminal convictions for CFAA violations in the context of civil law, for breach of contract or terms of service violations. Many common and insignificant online acts, such as password-sharing and copyright infringement, can transform a CFAA misdemeanor into a felony. The punishments are severe, similar to sentences for selling or importing drugs, and may be disproportionate. Prosecutors have used the CFAA to protect private business interests and to intimidate free-culture activists, deterring undesirable, yet legal, conduct.

One such example regarding the harshness of the law was shown in United States vs. Tyler King, where King refused initial offers by the government for involvement in a conspiracy to "gain unauthorized access" to a computer system for a small company that an ex-girlfriend of King worked for. His role, even while not directly involved, resulted in 6.5 years imprisonment. No financial motive was established. A non-profit was started to advocate against further harshness against others targeted under the broad law.

Professor of Law Ric Simmons notes that many provisions of the CFAA merely combine identical language to pre-existing federal laws with "the element of "access[ing] a protected computer without authorization, or [by] exceed[ing] authorized access," meaning that "the CFAA merely provides an additional charge for prosecutors to bring if the defendant used a computer while committing the crime." Professor Joseph Olivenbaum has similarly criticized the CFAA's "computer-specific approach," noting both the risk of redundancy and resultant definitional problems.

The CFAA increasingly presents real obstacles to journalists reporting stories important to the public's interest. As data journalism increasingly becomes "a good way of getting to the truth of things . . . in this post-truth era," as one data journalist told Google, the need for further clarity around the CFAA increases.

As per Star Kashman, an expert in cybersecurity law, the CFAA presents some challenges in cases related to Search Engine Hacking (also known as Google Dorking). Although Kashman states that accessing publicly available information is legal under the CFAA, she also notes that in many cases Search Engine Hacking is ultimately prosecuted under the CFAA. Kashman believes prosecuting cases of Google Dorking under the CFAA could render the CFAA void for vagueness by making it illegal to access publicly available information.

The Department of Justice has revised its policy for charging cases under the CFAA. For the first time, the policy tells federal prosecutors not to charge good-faith security research. It does not protect those acting in bad faith, for example people who look for vulnerabilities in devices so they can extort the owners.

=== Aaron Swartz ===
The government was able to bring such disproportionate charges against Aaron because of the broad scope of the Computer Fraud and Abuse Act (CFAA) and the wire fraud statute. It looks like the government used the vague wording of those laws to claim that violating an online service's user agreement or terms of service is a violation of the CFAA and the wire fraud statute.

Using the law in this way could criminalize many everyday activities and allow for outlandishly severe penalties.

When our laws need to be modified, Congress has a responsibility to act. A simple way to correct this dangerous legal interpretation is to change the CFAA and the wire fraud statutes to exclude terms of service violations. I will introduce a bill that does exactly that.

— Rep. Zoe Lofgren, Jan 15, 2013

In the wake of the prosecution and subsequent suicide of Aaron Swartz (who used a script to download scholarly research articles in excess of what JSTOR terms of service allowed), lawmakers proposed amending the Computer Fraud and Abuse Act. Representative Zoe Lofgren drafted a bill that would help "prevent what happened to Aaron from happening to other Internet users". Aaron's Law (H.R. 2454, S. 1196) would exclude terms of service violations from the 1984 Computer Fraud and Abuse Act and from the wire fraud statute.

In addition to Lofgren's efforts, Representatives Darrell Issa and Jared Polis (also on the House Judiciary Committee) raised questions in the immediate aftermath of Swartz's death regarding the government's handling of the case. Polis called the charges "ridiculous and trumped up," referring to Swartz as a "martyr." Issa, chair of the House Oversight Committee, announced an investigation of the Justice Department's prosecution.

By May 2014, Aaron's Law had stalled in committee. Filmmaker Brian Knappenberger alleges this occurred due to Oracle Corporation's financial interest in maintaining the status quo.

Aaron's Law was reintroduced in May 2015 (H.R. 1918, S. 1030) and again stalled. There has been no further introduction of related bills.

== Amendments history ==
=== 2008 ===
- Eliminated the requirement that information must have been stolen through an interstate or foreign communication, thereby expanding jurisdiction for cases involving theft of information from computers;
- Eliminated the requirement that the defendant's action must result in a loss exceeding $5,000 and created a felony offense where the damage affects ten or more computers, closing a gap in the law;
- Expanded 18 U.S.C. § 1030(a)(7) to criminalize not only explicit threats to cause damage to a computer, but also threats to (1) steal data on a victim's computer, (2) publicly disclose stolen data, or (3) not repair damage the offender already caused to the computer;
- Created a criminal offense for conspiring to commit a computer hacking offense under section 1030;
- Broadened the definition of "protected computer" in 18 U.S.C. § 1030(e)(2) to the full extent of Congress's commerce power by including those computers used in or affecting interstate or foreign commerce or communication; and
- Provided a mechanism for civil and criminal forfeiture of property used in or derived from section 1030 violations.

== See also ==
- Cybercrime
- Defense Secrets Act of 1911 / Espionage Act of 1917 / McCarran Internal Security Act 1950
- California Comprehensive Computer Data Access and Fraud Act
- Electronic Communications Privacy Act
- LVRC Holdings LLC v. Brekka
- In re DoubleClick
- Massachusetts Bay Transportation Authority v. Anderson
- Information technology audit
- Information technology security audit
- Computer fraud
- The Hacker Crackdown (mentions the law, & the eponymous Chicago task force)
- Protected computer
- Telecommunications Policy
- WikiLeaks
- Weev
