= Comparison of statistical packages =

The following tables compare general and technical information for many statistical analysis software packages.

== General information ==
Product	Developer	Latest version	Open source	Software license	Interface	Written in	Scripting languages
ADaMSoft	Marco Scarno	27 April 2015	Yes	GNU GPL	CLI, GUI	Java	
Alteryx	Alteryx Inc.	2019.2 (June 2019)	No	Proprietary	GUI, Python SDK, JavaScript SDK	C#, C++, Python, R, JavaScript	R, Python
Analyse-it	Analyse-it		No	Proprietary	GUI	C#, C++, Fortran	
ASReml	VSN International	26 March 2014	No	Proprietary	CLI		
BMDP	Statistical Solutions		No	Proprietary			
Dataplot	Alan Heckert	2013	Yes	Public domain	CLI, GUI	Fortran	
ELKI	LMU Munich	0.7.5 (15 February 2019)	Yes	AGPL	CLI, GUI	Java	Shell
Epi Info	Centers for Disease Control and Prevention	27 June 2016	Yes	Public domain	CLI, GUI	C#	
EViews	IHS Markit	14 (June 25, 2024)	No	Proprietary	CLI, GUI		
GAUSS	Aptech Systems	2020	No	Proprietary	CLI, GUI	C, C++	
GenStat	VSN International	2015	No	Proprietary	CLI, GUI		
GraphPad Prism	GraphPad Software, Inc.	February 2009	No	Proprietary	GUI		
gretl	The gretl Team	2024d (12 December 2024)	Yes	GNU GPL	CLI, GUI	C	hansl
Jamovi	The jamovi project	2023a (14 February 2024)	Yes	GNU GPL	GUI	C++, R, JavaScript, Python	
JASP	JASP team University of Amsterdam	0.19.3 (25 February 2025)	Yes	GNU GPL	GUI	C++, R, JavaScript, QML	R
JMP	JMP Statistical Discovery LLC	18.2.1 (11 March 2025)	No	Proprietary	GUI, CLI		JMP Scripting Language (JSL) Python
LIMDEP	Econometric Software, Inc., William Greene	May 2012	No	Proprietary	CLI, GUI	Fortran, C++	
Maple	Maplesoft	2025.2 (13 November 2025; 11 months ago) [±]	No	Proprietary	CLI, GUI		
Mathematica	Wolfram Research	15.0.1 (July 2026; 4 months ago) [±]	No	Proprietary	CLI, GUI	C, Mathematica	Wolfram Language
MATLAB	MathWorks	R2020b (17 September 2020)	No	Proprietary	CLI, GUI	C++, Java, MATLAB	
MedCalc	MedCalc Software Ltd	22 (12 May 2023)	No	Proprietary	GUI		MedCalc script
Minitab	Minitab, LLC	20 March 2024	No	Proprietary	CLI, GUI		
NCSS	NCSS, LLC	February 2015	No	Proprietary	GUI		
NLOGIT	Econometric Software, Inc., William Greene	May 2012	No	Proprietary	CLI, GUI	Fortran, C++	
OpenEpi	A. Dean, K. Sullivan, M. Soe	22 September 2014	Yes	GNU GPL	GUI	JavaScript, HTML	
Orange	Bioinformatics Laboratory, Faculty of Computer and Information Science, University of Ljubljana	10 January 2016	Yes	GNU GPL	GUI/Python	Python, Cython	Python
OriginPro	OriginLab	10.3 (21 November 2025)	No	Proprietary	GUI	C++	LabTalk
Ox	OxMetrics, J.A. Doornik	August 2011	No	Proprietary	CLI		
OxMetrics	OxMetrics, J.A. Doornik	August 2011	No	Proprietary	CLI, GUI		
Primer	PRIMER-e	January 2015	No	Proprietary	GUI		
PSPP	GNU Project	1.6.2 (2 July 2022)	Yes	GNU GPL	CLI, GUI	C	Perl (by PSPP-Perl)
R	R Foundation	4.5.3 (11 March 2026)	Yes	GNU GPL	CLI, GUI	C, Fortran, R	R, Python (by RPy), Perl (by Statistics::R module)
R++	Zebrys	1.6.15 (8 December 2023)	No	Proprietary	CLI, GUI	C++, Qt	R
RKWard	RKWard community	0.8.3 (24 April 2026)	Yes	GNU GPL	CLI, GUI	C++, ECMAScript	R, Python (by RPy), Perl (by Statistics::R module)
Revolution Analytics	Norman Nie	2007	Yes	Proprietary	CLI, GUI		
RATS	Estima	1 October 2010	No	Proprietary	CLI, GUI		
ROOT	ROOT Analysis Framework	6.24.00 (15 April 2021)	Yes	GNU GPL	GUI	C++	C++, Python
SageMath	>100 developers worldwide	9.5 (30 January 2022; 4 years ago) [±]	Yes	GNU GPL	CLI, GUI	Python, Cython	Python
Salstat	Alan J. Salmoni, Mark Livingstone	16 May 2014	Yes	GNU GPL	CLI, GUI	Python, NumPy, SciPy	Python
SAS	SAS Institute	9.4M9 (June 2025), Viya 4 (December 2020)	No	Proprietary	CLI, GUI	C	SAS, Common Algebraic Specification Language (CASL), APIs for R, Python, Lua, Java
scikit-learn	David Cournapeau, Inria	1.2.0 (6 December 2022)	Yes	BSD	CLI	Python, C	Python
SciPy	Enthought	1.5.3 (17 October 2020)	Yes	BSD	CLI	Python, C, Fortran	Python
Shazam	Shazam Analytics Ltd	11.1.4 (April 2015)	No	Proprietary	CLI, GUI	Fortran, C++, C	
SOCR	UCLA and University of Michigan	3.0 (10 May 2015)	Yes	LGPL	GUI	Java	
SOFA Statistics	Grant Paton-Simpson	1.5.7 (11 September 2024)	Yes	AGPL	GUI	Python	Python
SPlus	Insightful Inc.	2010	No	Proprietary	CLI		
SPSS	IBM	28.0 (24 May 2021)	No	Proprietary	CLI, GUI	Java, C, C++, Fortran	R, Python, SaxBasic
Stata	StataCorp LLC	19 (8 April 2025)	No	Proprietary	CLI, GUI	C	ado, Mata
StatCrunch	Pearson Education	3 April 2018	No	Proprietary	GUI		
Statgraphics	Statgraphics Technologies Incorporated	April 2023	No	Proprietary	GUI	C++	R, Python
Statistica	Tibco Software	13.5 (October 2018)	No	Proprietary	GUI	C++	R, Statistica Visual Basic (SVB)
StatPlus	AnalystSoft	7.0 (October 2019)	No	Proprietary	GUI		
SYSTAT	Systat Software Inc.	21 February 2007	No	Proprietary	CLI, GUI		
TSP	TSP International	September 2009	No	Proprietary	CLI	Fortran	
Winpepi	J. H. Abramson	June 2008	No	Proprietary	GUI		
WPS Analytics	World Programming	March 2018	No	Proprietary	CLI, GUI	C, assembly	Python, R, SAS, SQL
WINKS	TexaSoft	August 2013	No	Proprietary	GUI	Fortran, Visual Basic	
XploRe	MD*Tech	2006	No	Proprietary	GUI		
Product	Developer	Latest version	Open source	Software license	Interface	Written in	Scripting languages

== Operating system support ==
Product	Windows	Mac OS	Linux	BSD	Unix	Cloud
ADaMSoft	Yes	Yes	Yes	Yes	Yes	No
Alteryx	Yes	No	No	No	No	No
Analyse-it	Yes	No	No	No	No	No
BMDP	Yes					No
Dataplot	Yes	Yes	Yes	Yes	Yes	No
ELKI	Yes	Yes	Yes	Yes	Yes	No
Epi Info	Yes	No	No	No	No	No
EViews	Yes	Yes	No	No	No	No
GAUSS	Yes	Yes	Yes	No	Yes	No
GraphPad Prism	Yes	Yes	No	No	No	No
gretl	Yes	Yes	Yes	Yes	No	No
Jamovi	Yes	Yes	Yes	No	No	browser
JASP	Yes	Yes	Yes	No	No	browser
Julia	Yes	Yes	Yes	Yes	Yes	Yes
JMP	Yes	Yes	Terminated	No	No	No
LIMDEP	Yes	No	No	No	No	No
Maple	Yes	Yes	Yes	No	Yes	No
MATLAB	Yes	Yes	Yes	No	No	No
Mathematica	Yes	Yes	Yes	No	Yes	Yes
MedCalc	Yes	Yes	Yes	No	No	No
Minitab	Yes	Yes	No	No	No	Yes
NCSS	Yes	Yes	No	No	No	No
NLOGIT	Yes	No	No	No	No	No
OpenEpi	Yes	Yes	Yes	Yes	Yes	No
Orange	Yes	Yes	Yes	Yes	Yes	No
OriginPro	Yes	No	No	No	No	No
Primer	Yes	No	No	No	No	No
PSPP	Yes	Yes	Yes	Yes	Yes	No
R Commander	Yes	Yes	Yes	Yes	Yes	No
R	Yes	Yes	Yes	Yes	Yes	Yes
R++	Yes	Yes	No	No	No	No
RATS	Yes	Yes	Yes	No	Yes	No
RKWard	Yes	Yes	Yes	No	Yes	No
ROOT	Yes	Yes	Yes	Yes	Yes	No
SageMath	Partial	Yes	Yes	No	Yes	Yes
Salstat	Yes	Yes	Yes	Yes	Yes	No
SAS	Yes	Terminated	Yes	No	Yes	Yes
SciPy	Yes	Yes	Yes	Yes	Yes	No
Shazam	Yes	No	No	No	No	No
SOCR	Yes	Yes	Yes	Yes	Yes	No
SOFA Statistics	Yes	Yes	Yes	Yes	Yes	No
SPlus	Yes	No	Yes	No	Yes	No
SPSS	Yes	Yes	Yes	No	Yes	Yes
Stata	Yes	Yes	Yes	No	Yes	No
StatCrunch	Yes	Yes	Yes	Yes	Yes	Yes
Statgraphics	Yes	No	No	No	No	No
Statistica	Yes	No	No	No	No	No
StatPlus	Yes	Yes	No	No	No	No
SYSTAT	Yes	Terminated	No	No	No	No
TSP	Yes	Yes	Yes	Yes	Yes	No
The Unscrambler	Yes	No	No	No	No	No
Winpepi	Yes	No	No	No	No	No
WPS Analytics	Yes	Yes	Yes	No	Yes	Yes
WINKS	Yes	No	No	No	No	No
XploRe	Yes	No	Yes	No	Yes	No
Product	Windows	Mac OS	Linux	BSD	Unix	SaaS

== ANOVA ==
Support for various ANOVA methods

Product	One-way	Two-way	MANOVA	GLM	Mixed model	Post-hoc	Latin squares
ADaMSoft	Yes	Yes	No	No	No	No	No
Alteryx	Yes	Yes	Yes	Yes	Yes		
Analyse-it	Yes	Yes	No	No	Yes	Yes	No
BMDP	Yes	Yes	Yes	Yes	Yes	Yes	
Epi Info	Yes	Yes	No	No	No	No	No
EViews	Yes						
GAUSS		No	No	No		No	No
GenStat	Yes	Yes	Yes	Yes	Yes	Yes	Yes
GraphPad Prism	Yes	Yes	No	Yes	Yes	Yes	No
gretl	Yes						
JASP	Yes	Yes	Yes	Yes	Yes	Yes	Yes
Julia with packages	?	?	?	?	?	?	?
JMP	Yes	Yes	Yes	Yes	Yes	Yes	Yes
LIMDEP	Yes	Yes	Yes	Yes	Yes	No	No
Maple	Yes	No	No	No	No	No	Yes
Mathematica	Yes	Yes	No	Yes		Yes	No
MATLAB + Statistics Toolbox	Yes	Yes	Yes	Yes	Yes	Yes	Yes
MedCalc	Yes	Yes	No	Yes		Yes	No
Minitab	Yes	Yes	Yes	Yes	Yes	Yes	Yes
NCSS	Yes	Yes	Yes	Yes	Yes	Yes	Yes
NLOGIT	Yes	Yes	Yes	Yes	Yes	No	No
Orange	Yes	No	No	No	No	No	No
OriginPro	Yes	Yes	Yes	Yes	Yes	Yes	Yes
PSPP	Yes	Yes	No	Yes		Yes	Yes
R	Yes	Yes	Yes	Yes	Yes	Yes	Yes
R Commander	Yes	Yes	Yes	Yes		Yes	Yes
SageMath	Yes	Yes	Yes		Yes	Yes	
Salstat	Yes	No	No	No		No	No
SAS	Yes	Yes	Yes	Yes	Yes	Yes	Yes
SciPy	Yes	No	No	No	No	No	No
Shazam	Yes	Yes	No	Yes	Yes	Yes	No
SOCR	Yes	Yes	No	No		Yes	Yes
SOFA Statistics	Yes	No	No	No		No	No
SPlus	Yes	Yes	Yes	Yes		Yes	Yes
SPSS	Yes	Yes	Yes	Yes	Yes	Yes	Yes
Stata	Yes	Yes	Yes	Yes	Yes	Yes	Yes
StatCrunch	Yes	Yes	No	No	No	Yes	No
Statgraphics	Yes	Yes	Yes	Yes	Yes	Yes	Yes
Statistica	Yes	Yes	Yes	Yes		Yes	Yes
StatPlus	Yes	Yes	Yes	Yes		Yes	Yes
SYSTAT	Yes	Yes	Yes	Yes		Yes	Yes
TSP	No	No	No	No		No	No
The Unscrambler	Yes	No	No	No		No	No
WINKS	Yes	Yes	No	Yes	Yes	Yes	No
Winpepi	Yes	Yes	No	No		No	No
WPS Analytics	Yes	Yes	Yes	Yes	Yes	Yes	Yes
Product	One-way	Two-way	MANOVA	GLM	Mixed model	Post-hoc	Latin squares

== Regression ==
Support for various regression methods.

Product	OLS	WLS	2SLS	NLLS	Logistic	GLM	LAD	Stepwise	Quantile	Probit	Cox	Poisson	MLR
ADaMSoft	Yes	Yes	No	Yes	Yes	No	No	Yes					
Alteryx	Yes	Yes			Yes	Yes		Yes		Yes			
Analyse-it	Yes				Yes								Yes
BMDP	Yes				Yes			Yes			Yes		
Epi Info	Yes	No	No	No	Yes	No	No	No			Yes		
EViews	Yes	Yes	Yes	Yes	Yes	Yes	Yes	Yes	Yes	Yes		Yes	Yes
GAUSS	Yes	Yes			Yes	Yes	No		Yes			Yes	Yes
GenStat	Yes	Yes	Yes	Yes	Yes	Yes	Yes	Yes	Yes	Yes	Yes	Yes	Yes
GraphPad Prism	Yes	Yes	No	Yes	Yes	No	No	No	No	No		No	Yes
gretl	Yes	Yes	Yes	Yes	Yes	No	Yes	Yes	Yes	Yes		Yes	
JASP	Yes	Yes	No	Yes	Yes	Yes	No	Yes	No	Yes	Yes	Yes	Yes
JMP	Yes	Yes	No	Yes	Yes	Yes	No	Yes	In JMP Pro	Yes	In JMP Pro	Yes	Yes
LIMDEP	Yes	Yes	Yes	Yes	Yes	Yes	Yes	Yes	Yes	Yes	Yes	Yes	Yes
Maple	Yes	Yes	No	Yes	No	No	No	No	No	No	No	No	Yes
Mathematica	Yes	Yes		Yes	Yes	Yes	Yes		Yes	Yes	Yes	Yes	Yes
MATLAB + Statistics Toolbox	Yes	Yes	Yes	Yes	Yes	Yes	Yes	Yes	Yes	Yes	Yes	Yes	Yes
MedCalc	Yes	Yes		Yes	Yes			Yes		Yes	Yes		Yes
Minitab	Yes	Yes	No	Yes	Yes	No	No	Yes	No	Yes		Yes	Yes
NCSS	Yes	Yes	Yes	Yes	Yes	Yes	Yes	Yes	Yes	Yes	Yes	Yes	Yes
NLOGIT	Yes	Yes	Yes	Yes	Yes	Yes	Yes	Yes	Yes	Yes	Yes	Yes	Yes
Orange	Yes	Yes	No	Yes	Yes	No	No	No	No	No	No	No	Yes
OriginPro	Yes	Yes	No	Yes	Yes	Yes	No	Yes	Yes	Yes	Yes	Yes	Yes
PSPP	Yes												
R	Yes	Yes	Yes	Yes	Yes	Yes	Yes	Yes	Yes	Yes	Yes	Yes	Yes
R Commander	Yes					Yes			No				
RATS	Yes	Yes	Yes	Yes	Yes	Yes	Yes	Yes	Yes	Yes		Yes	Yes
SageMath	Yes	Yes	Yes	Yes	Yes	Yes	Yes	Yes	Yes	Yes		Yes	
Salstat	No	No	No	No	No	No	No	No	No	No		No	No
SAS	Yes	Yes	Yes	Yes	Yes	Yes	Yes	Yes	Yes	Yes	Yes	Yes	Yes
SciPy	Yes	No	No	Yes	No	No	No	Yes	No	No	No	No	No
Shazam	Yes	Yes	Yes	Yes	Yes	Yes	Yes	Yes	Yes	Yes	Yes	Yes	Yes
SOCR	Yes	No	No	No	Yes	No	No	No					
SPlus	Yes			Yes	Yes	Yes		Yes	Yes				
SPSS	Yes	Yes	Yes	Yes	Yes	Yes	Yes	Yes	Yes	Yes	Yes	Yes	Yes
Stata	Yes	Yes	Yes	Yes	Yes	Yes	Yes	Yes	Yes	Yes	Yes	Yes	Yes
StatCrunch	Yes	No	No	No	Yes	No	No	No	No	No	No	No	Yes
Statgraphics	Yes	Yes	No	Yes	Yes	Yes	No	Yes	Yes	Yes	Yes	Yes	Yes
Statistica	Yes	Yes	Yes	Yes	Yes	Yes	Yes	Yes	No	Yes	Yes	Yes	Yes
StatPlus	Yes	Yes	Yes	Yes	Yes	Yes	No	Yes		Yes	Yes	No	Yes
StarPrism	Yes	No	No	No	Yes	No	No	No	No	No	No	No	Yes
SYSTAT	Yes	Yes	Yes	Yes	Yes	Yes	Yes	Yes	No				
TSP	Yes	Yes	Yes	Yes	Yes	No	Yes	No	Yes	Yes		Yes	Yes
The Unscrambler	Yes	Yes	Yes	Yes	Yes	Yes	Yes	Yes	Yes	Yes	Yes	Yes	Yes
WINKS	Yes				Yes	Yes		Yes					Yes
Winpepi	Yes				Yes					Yes		Yes	Yes
WPS Analytics	Yes	Yes		Yes	Yes	Yes		Yes		Yes	Yes	Yes	Yes
Product	OLS	WLS	2SLS	NLLS	Logistic	GLM	LAD	Stepwise	Quantile	Probit	Cox	Poisson	MLR

== Time series analysis ==
Support for various time series analysis methods.

Product	ARIMA	GARCH	Unit root test	Cointegration test	VAR	Multivariate GARCH
Alteryx	Yes	No				
Analyse-it						
EViews	Yes	Yes	Yes	Yes	Yes	Yes
GAUSS	Yes	Yes	Yes	Yes	Yes	Yes
GraphPad Prism	No	No	No	No	No	
gretl	Yes	Yes	Yes	Yes	Yes	Yes
JASP	Yes	No	Yes	No	No	No
JMP	Yes					
LIMDEP	Yes	Yes	Yes	Yes	Yes	No
Mathematica	Yes	Yes	Yes	Yes	Yes	Yes
MATLAB + Econometrics Toolbox	Yes	Yes	Yes	Yes	Yes	
MedCalc	No	No	No	No	No	
Minitab	Yes	No	No	No	No	
NCSS	Yes					
NLOGIT	Yes	Yes	Yes	Yes	Yes	No
Orange	Yes	No	No	No	Yes	No
OriginPro	Yes	No	Yes	No	No	No
PSPP						
R	Yes	Yes	Yes	Yes	Yes	Yes
R Commander						
RATS	Yes	Yes	Yes	Yes	Yes	Yes
SageMath	Yes	Yes	Yes	Yes	Yes	Yes
Salstat	No	No	No	No	No	No
SAS	Yes	Yes	Yes	Yes	Yes	Yes
SciPy	No	No	No	No	No	No
Shazam	Yes	Yes	Yes	Yes	Yes	No
SOCR	No	No	No	No	No	
Stata	Yes	Yes	Yes	Yes	Yes	Yes
Statgraphics	Yes	No	No	No	No	
Statistica	Yes	No	No	No	No	
StatPlus	Yes	No	Yes	No	No	
SPlus		Yes			Yes	
SPSS	Yes	Yes				
SYSTAT	Yes					
TSP	Yes	Yes	Yes	Yes	Yes	No
WINKS	Yes	No	No	No	No	
Winpepi						
WPS Analytics	Yes		Yes			
Product	ARIMA	GARCH	Unit root test	Cointegration test	VAR	Multivariate GARCH

== Charts and diagrams ==
Support for various statistical charts and diagrams.

Chart	Bar chart	Box plot	Correlogram	Histogram	Line chart	Scatterplot	Violin plot	Jitter plot	Raincloud plot	Radar chart	Network diagram	Pie chart	Ring chart	Heat map
ADaMSoft	Yes	Yes	Yes	Yes	Yes	Yes								
Alteryx	Yes	Yes		Yes	Yes	Yes								
Analyse-it	Yes	Yes	Yes	Yes	Yes	Yes								
BMDP				Yes		Yes								
ELKI	No	No	No	Yes	Yes	Yes								
Epi Info	Yes	No	No	Yes	Yes	Yes								
EViews	Yes	Yes	Yes	Yes	Yes	Yes								
GAUSS	Yes	Yes		Yes	Yes	Yes								
GenStat	Yes	Yes	Yes	Yes	Yes	Yes								
GraphPad Prism	Yes	Yes	Yes	Yes	Yes	Yes	Yes							
gretl	Yes	Yes	Yes	Yes	Yes	Yes								
JASP	Yes	Yes	Yes	Yes	Yes	Yes	Yes	Yes	Yes	No	Yes	Yes	No	Yes
JMP	Yes	Yes	Yes	Yes	Yes	Yes								
LIMDEP	Yes	Yes	Yes	Yes	Yes	Yes								
Maple	Yes	Yes	Yes	Yes	Yes	Yes								
Mathematica	Yes	Yes	Yes	Yes	Yes	Yes	Yes							
MATLAB + Statistics Toolbox	Yes	Yes	Yes	Yes	Yes	Yes								
MedCalc	Yes	Yes	Yes	Yes	Yes	Yes	Yes							Yes
Minitab	Yes	Yes	Yes	Yes	Yes	Yes								
NCSS	Yes	Yes	Yes	Yes	Yes	Yes								
NLOGIT	Yes	Yes	Yes	Yes	Yes	Yes								
Orange	Yes	Yes	Yes	Yes	Yes	Yes								
OriginPro	Yes	Yes	Yes	Yes	Yes	Yes	Yes	Yes	Yes	Yes	Yes	Yes	Yes	Yes
PSPP														
R	Yes	Yes	Yes	Yes	Yes	Yes	Yes	Yes	Yes	Yes	Yes	Yes	Yes	Yes
R Commander														
RATS	Yes	Yes	Yes	Yes	Yes	Yes								
SageMath	Yes	Yes	Yes	Yes	Yes	Yes								
SAS	Yes	Yes	Yes	Yes	Yes	Yes								
SciPy	Yes	Yes	No	Yes	Yes	Yes								
Shazam	Yes	Yes	Yes	Yes	Yes	Yes								
SOCR	Yes	Yes	Yes	Yes	Yes	Yes								
SOFA Statistics	Yes	Yes	No	Yes	Yes	Yes						Yes		
SPlus														
SPSS	Yes	Yes	Yes	Yes	Yes	Yes	Yes	No	No	Yes	Yes	Yes	Yes	Yes
Stata	Yes	Yes	Yes	Yes	Yes	Yes								
StatCrunch	Yes	Yes	No	Yes	Yes	Yes								
Statgraphics	Yes	Yes	Yes	Yes	Yes	Yes								
Statistica	Yes	Yes	Yes	Yes	Yes	Yes								
StatPlus	Yes	Yes	Yes	Yes	Yes	Yes								
SYSTAT	Yes	Yes	Yes	Yes	Yes	Yes								
TSP	No	No	Yes	Yes	Yes	Yes								
The Unscrambler	Yes			Yes	Yes	Yes								
WINKS	Yes	Yes	Yes	Yes	Yes	Yes								
Winpepi					Yes	Yes								
WPS Analytics	Yes	Yes	Yes	Yes	Yes	Yes								

== Other abilities ==
Product	S/W type					Descriptive statistics		Nonparametric statistics		Quality control	Analysis			Data processing	
Product	S	St	A	X	C	Base stat. (Note: Base Statistics (such as t-test, f-test, etc.))	Normality tests (Note: Normality Tests, data exploring)	CTA (Note: Contingency Tables Analysis)	Nonparametric comparison, ANOVA	Quality control	Survival analysis	Cluster analysis	Discriminant analysis	BDP (Note: Base Data Processing, f.ex. sorting)	Ext. (Note: Extended (data sampling, transformation))
ADaMSoft	Yes					Good	Good	Good	Good	Fail	Fail	Good	Good	Good	Good
Alteryx	Yes					Good	Good	Good	Good	Good	Good	Good	Good	Good	Good
Analyse-it				Yes		Good	Good	Good	Good	Good	Fail	Fail	Fail	Good	Good
BMDP						Good	Good	Good	Good		Good	Good	Good		
Epi Info	Yes					Good	Fail	Good	Good	Fail	Good	Fail	Fail	Good	Good
Gauss	Yes					Good	Good	Fail	Fail	Fail	Fail	Fail	Fail	Good	Good
GenStat		Yes				Good	Good	Good	Good	Good	Good	Good	Good	Good	Good
GraphPad Prism	Yes					Good	Good	Fail	Good	Fail	Good	Fail	Fail	Fail	Fail
Gretl	Yes					Good	Good	Good	Good	Fail	Good	Fail	Fail	Good	Good
JASP	Yes	Yes			Yes	Good	Good	Good	Good	Good	Good	Good	Good	Good	Good
JMP	Yes					Good	Good	Good	Good	Good	Good	Good	Good	Good	Good
LIMDEP	Yes					Good	Good	Good	Good	Fail	Fail	Good	Good	Good	Good
Maple	Yes					Good	Good			Good	Fail	Fail	Fail	Good	Good
Mathematica	Yes					Good	Good	Good	Good	Fail	Good	Good	Fail	Good	Good
MATLAB + Statistics Toolbox	Yes					Good	Good	Good	Good	Good	Good	Good	Good	Good	Good
MedCalc	Yes					Good	Good	Good	Good	Good	Good	Fail	Fail	Good	Good
Minitab	Yes					Good	Good	Good	Good	Good	Good	Good	Good	Good	Good
NCSS	Yes					Good	Good	Good	Good	Good	Good	Good	Good	Good	Good
NLOGIT	Yes					Good	Good	Good	Good	Fail	Fail	Good	Good	Good	Good
OpenEpi	Yes					Good	Fail	Good	Fail	Fail	Fail	Fail	Fail	Fail	Fail
Orange	Yes					Good	Good	Good	Good	Good	Fail	Good	Good	Good	Good
OriginPro	Yes					Good	Good	Good	Good	Good	Good	Good	Good	Good	Good
PSPP	Yes					Good	Good								
R		Yes				Good	Good	Good	Good	Good	Good	Good	Good	Good	Good
RATS						Good	Good	Fail	Fail	Fail	Fail	Fail	Fail	Good	Good
SAS	Yes					Good	Good	Good	Good	Good	Good	Good	Good	Good	Good
SciPy		Yes				Good	Good	Fail	Good	Fail	Fail	Fail	Fail	Good	Good
Shazam	Yes					Good	Good	Fail	Fail	Fail	Fail	Fail	Fail	Good	Good
SOCR	Yes					Good	Good	Good	Good	Fail	Good	Good	Fail	Good	Good
SOFA Statistics	Yes						Fail	Good	Good	Fail	Fail	Fail	Fail	Fail	Fail
Stata	Yes					Good	Good	Good	Good	Good	Good	Good	Good	Good	Good
StatCrunch					Yes	Good	Good	Good	Good	Good	Fail	Fail	Fail	Good	Good
Statgraphics	Yes					Good	Good	Good	Good	Good	Good	Good	Good	Good	Good
Statistica	Yes					Good	Good	Good	Good	Good	Good	Good	Good	Good	Good
StatPlus	Yes					Good	Good	Good	Good	Good	Good	Fail	Good	Good	Good
SPlus		Yes				Good	Good	Good	Good	Good	Good	Good	Good	Good	Good
SPSS	Yes					Good	Good	Good	Good	Good	Good	Good	Good	Good	Good
SYSTAT	Yes					Good	Good	Good	Good	Good	Good	Good	Good	Good	Good
TSP	Yes					Good	Good	Fail	Fail	Fail	Fail	Fail	Fail	Good	Good
The Unscrambler	Yes					Good	Good		Good			Good	Good		
WINKS	Yes					Good	Good	Good	Good	Good	Good			Good	Good
Winpepi	Yes					Good	Good	Good	Good	Fail	Good	Good	Fail	Fail	Fail
WPS Analytics	Yes					Good	Good	Good	Good	Good	Good	Good	Good	Good	Good
Product	S/W type					Descriptive statistics		Nonparametric statistics		Quality control	Analysis			Data processing	
Product	S	St	A	X	C	Base stat.	Normality tests	CTA	Nonparametric comparison, ANOVA	Quality control	Survival analysis	Cluster analysis	Discriminant analysis	BDP	Ext.

== See also ==
- Comparison of computer algebra systems
- Comparison of deep learning software
- Comparison of survey software
- Comparison of Gaussian process software
- List of scientific journals in statistics
- List of statistical packages
