= OpenEpi =

Free software for biostatistics

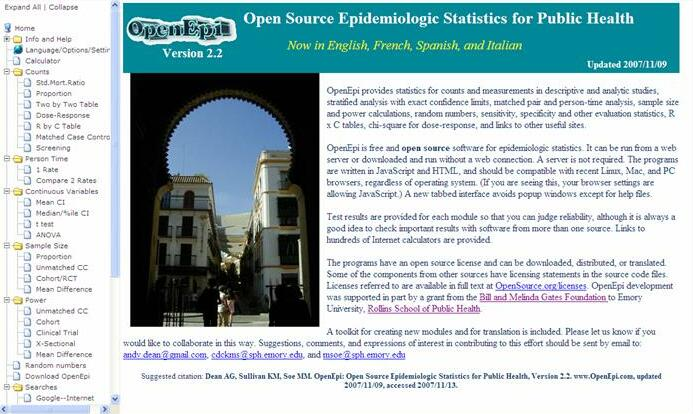
- OpenEpi 2.3
- Developers: AG Dean, KM Sullivan, MM Soe
- Stable release: 3.03 / September 22, 2014; 12 years ago
- Operating system: Cross-platform
- Platform: HTML, JavaScript
- Type: Web application, Statistical analysis
- License: MIT License
- Website: www.openepi.com

OpenEpi is a free, web-based, open source, operating system-independent series of programs for use in epidemiology, biostatistics, public health, and medicine, providing a number of epidemiologic and statistical tools for summary data. OpenEpi was developed in JavaScript and HTML, and can be run in modern web browsers. The program can be run from the OpenEpi website or downloaded and run without a web connection. The source code and documentation is downloadable and freely available for use by other investigators. OpenEpi has been reviewed, both by media organizations and in research journals.

The OpenEpi developers have had extensive experience in the development and testing of Epi Info, a program developed by the Centers for Disease Control and Prevention (CDC) and widely used around the world for data entry and analysis. OpenEpi was developed to perform analyses found in the DOS version of Epi Info modules StatCalc and EpiTable, to improve upon the types of analyses provided by these modules, and to provide a number of tools and calculations not currently available in Epi Info. It is the first step toward an entirely web-based set of epidemiologic software tools. OpenEpi can be thought of as an important companion to Epi Info and to other programs such as SAS, PSPP, SPSS, Stata, SYSTAT, Minitab, Epidata, and R (see the R programming language). Another functionally similar Windows-based program is Winpepi. See also list of statistical packages and comparison of statistical packages. There is a similar program in beta version called OpenEpiSheets based on Google Sheets and is available here: https://sites.google.com/view/epi-centre-org/openepisheetss. Both OpenEpi and Epi Info were developed with the goal of providing tools for low and moderate resource areas of the world. The initial development of OpenEpi was supported by a grant from the Bill and Melinda Gates Foundation to Emory University.

== Types ==
The types of calculations currently performed by OpenEpi include:

- Various confidence intervals for proportions, rates, standardized mortality ratio, mean, median, percentiles
- 2x2 crude and stratified tables for count and rate data
- Matched case-control analysis
- Test for trend with count data
- Independent t-test and one-way ANOVA
- Diagnostic and screening test analyses with receiver operating characteristic (ROC) curves
- Sample size for proportions, cross-sectional surveys, unmatched case-control, cohort, randomized controlled trials, and comparison of two means
- Power calculations for proportions (unmatched case-control, cross-sectional, cohort, randomized controlled trials) and for the comparison of two means
- Random number generator

For epidemiologists and other health researchers, OpenEpi performs a number of calculations based on tables not found in most epidemiologic and statistical packages. For example, for a single 2x2 table, in addition to the results presented in other programs, OpenEpi provides estimates for:

- Etiologic or prevented fraction in the population and in exposed with confidence intervals, based on risk, odds, or rate data
- The cross-product and MLE odds ratio estimate
- Mid-p exact p-values and confidence limits for the odds ratio
- Calculations of rate ratios and rate differences with confidence intervals and statistical tests.

For stratified 2x2 tables with count data, OpenEpi provides:

- Mantel-Haenszel (MH) and precision-based estimates of the risk ratio and odds ratio
- Precision-based adjusted risk difference
- Tests for interaction for the risk ratio, odds ratio, and risk difference
- Four different confidence limit methods for the odds ratio.

Similar to Epi Info, in a stratified analysis, both crude and adjusted estimates are provided so that the assessment of confounding can be made. With rate data, OpenEpi provides adjusted rate ratio's and rate differences, and tests for interaction. Finally, with count data, OpenEpi also performs a test for trend, for both crude data and stratified data.

In addition to being used to analyze data by health researchers, OpenEpi has been used as a training tool for teaching epidemiology to students at: Emory University, University of Massachusetts, University of Michigan, University of Minnesota, Morehouse College, Columbia University, University of Wisconsin, San Jose State University, University of Medicine and Dentistry of New Jersey, University of Washington, and elsewhere. This includes campus-based and distance learning courses. Because OpenEpi is easy to use, requires no programming experience, and can be run on the internet, students can use the program and focus on the interpretation of results. Users can run the program in English, French, Spanish, Portuguese or Italian.

Comments and suggestions for improvements are welcomed and the developers respond to user queries. The developers encourage others to develop modules that could be added to OpenEpi and provide a developer's tool at the website. Planned future development include improvements to existing modules, development of new modules, translation into other languages, and add the ability to cut and paste data and/or read data files.

== See also ==
- Web based simulation
