= DAP (software) =

Statistics and graphics software

- Developer(s): GNU Project
- Initial release: 1998; 27 years ago
- Stable release: 3.10 / April 16, 2014; 11 years ago
- Repository: cvs.savannah.gnu.org/viewvc/dap/
- Written in: C
- Operating system: Cross-platform
- Type: Statistical Analysis
- License: GNU General Public License
- Website: www.gnu.org/software/dap

DAP is a statistics and graphics program based on the C programming language that performs data management, analysis, and C-style graphical visualization tasks without requiring complex syntax. Its name is an acronym for Data Analysis and Presentation.

DAP was written to be a free replacement for SAS, but users are assumed to have a basic familiarity with the C programming language in order to permit greater flexibility.

It has been designed to be used on large data sets and is primarily used in statistical consulting practices.

However, even with its clear benefits, DAP hasn't been updated since 2014 and hasn't seen widespread use when compared to other statistical analysis programs.

== Features ==
DAP is a command line driven program. Below are various features that DAP can perform.

DAP can compute means and percentiles, correlation, & ANOVA from data sets. This includes Unbalanced as well as Crossed, Nested ANOVA. It can also be used to create scatterplots, line graphs and histograms of data. This can include split plots, treatment combinations, as well as latin squares.

DAP can perform linear regression and can utilize regressions to build linear models. In addition to linear regression, DAP can also perform logistic regression analysis as well. There's a variety of other analysis that DAP can do as well including building loglinear models as well as Logit models for linear-by-linear association.

In terms of models, DAP can create mixed balanced and unbalanced models as well as random unbalanced models.

It has been designed so as to cope with very large data sets; even when the size of the data exceeds the size of the computer's memory because the program processes files one line at a time rather than reading entire files into memory.

== Applications ==
Industry Uses

- Statistical Consulting Practices
- Low-level Statistical Analysis

== See also ==
- Comparison of statistical packages
- gretl
- PSPP

== Sources ==
- Greve, Georg C. F. (2001). "Brave GNU World - Issue #33". Georg's Brave GNU World - GNU Project - Free Software Foundation (FSF). FSF. "Dap has been used for about three years now, so it has been thoroughly tested and can be recommended to interested users"
