= EViews =

Statistical package

- Developers: S&P Global
- Stable release: 14 / June 25, 2024; 2 years ago
- Operating system: Windows 7 or newer
- Type: Econometrics software
- License: Proprietary
- Website: eviews.com

EViews is a statistical package for Windows and MacOS, used mainly for time-series oriented econometric analysis. It is developed by Quantitative Micro Software (QMS), now a part of IHS. Version 1.0 was released in March 1994, and replaced MicroTSP. The TSP software and programming language had been originally developed by Robert Hall in 1965. The current version of EViews is 14, released in June 2024.

== Features ==
EViews can be used for general statistical analysis and econometric analyses, such as cross-section and panel data analysis and time series estimation and forecasting.

EViews combines spreadsheet and relational database technology with the traditional tasks found in statistical software, and uses a Windows GUI. This is combined with a programming language which displays limited object orientation.

EViews allows access to 3rd party time series data from multiple providers including: Thomson Reuters Datastream, Moody's Economy.com, Macrobond Financial, Haver Analytics, and CEIC.

== Data formats ==
EViews relies heavily on a proprietary and undocumented file format for data storage. However, for input and output it supports numerous formats, including databank format, Excel formats, PSPP/SPSS, DAP/SAS, Stata, RATS, and TSP. EViews can access ODBC databases. EViews file formats can be partially opened by gretl.

== Stationarity of data ==
EViews helps researchers detect unit roots in their data series. Multiple unit root tests are available in the research software, including Dickey–Fuller, Phillips–Perron, Kwiatkowski–Phillips–Schmidt–Shin and Elliott, Rothenberg and Stock Point-Optimal tests.

== Estimation ==
EViews helps researchers and professionals to estimate linear equations and systems of linear equations models of time series and panel data with various methods. Eviews allows the user to assess econometric results easily.

== Version ==
Version	Release date
1	March 1994
5	2004
5.1	February 2005
6	March 2007
7	December 2009
8	February 2013
8.1	September 2014
9	March 2015
9.5	March 2016
10	June 2017
10+	October 2017
11	April 2019
12	November 2020
13	August 2022
14	June 2024

== See also ==
- Comparison of statistical packages
- Gretl
- GNU Octave
- Matlab
- R
- SAS
- Scilab
- SPSS
- Stata
