= SOCR (disambiguation) =

SOCR is an acronym that can refer to:

- Statistics Online Computational Resource
- Seattle Office for Civil Rights
- State Operated Community Residence
- Stand-alone optical character reader
- Special Operational Capability Report
- Special Operations Craft – Riverine (SOC-R)
