= AREMOS =

Data management and econometrics software

AREMOS is a data management and econometrics software package released by Global Insight. It was most popular in the late 1980s and 1990s, when it was used by leading economists. Developed as a DOS application by Wharton Econometric Forecasting Associates – WEFA now IHS Markit, it has gone through many iterations. Thomsons' Datastream macroeconomic databases which were accessible with AREMOS, were a key selling point.

The U.S. statistical agency Bureau of Economic Analysis ran AREMOS extensively until 2015.

Today its use is largely legacy and has been superseded by newer econometric packages such as EViews, developed by WEFA successor company, IHS Markit. Although sales of AREMOS to new customers ended in late 2015, certain existing customers were given the option to purchase a perpetual license which doesn't expire until the end of 2036.
