= SOFA Statistics =

Open-source statistical package

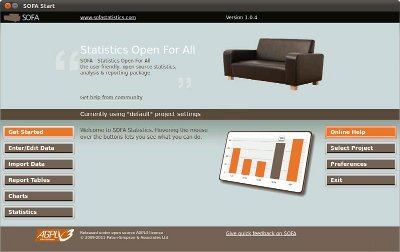
- SOFA Statistics
- Developers: Paton-Simpson & Associates Ltd
- Stable release: 1.5.7 / 11 September 2024; 21 months ago
- Written in: Python
- Operating system: Cross-platform
- Type: Statistical analysis
- License: AGPL
- Website: www.sofastatistics.com

SOFA Statistics is an open-source statistical package. The name stands for Statistics Open For All.

It has a graphical user interface and can connect directly to MySQL, PostgreSQL, SQLite, MS Access (map), and Microsoft SQL Server. Data can also be imported from CSV and Tab-Separated files or spreadsheets (Microsoft Excel, OpenOffice.org Calc, Gumeric, Google Docs). The main statistical tests available are Independent and Paired t-tests, Wilcoxon signed ranks, Mann–Whitney U, Pearson's chi squared, Kruskal Wallis H, one-way ANOVA, Spearman's R, and Pearson's R. Nested tables can be produced with row and column percentages, totals, standard deviation, mean, median, lower and upper quartiles, and sum.

Installation packages are available for several operating systems such as Microsoft Windows, Ubuntu, Arch Linux, Linux Mint. On macOS, SOFA only runs on older versions the OS with Leopard being the minimum version.

SOFA Statistics is written in Python, and the widget toolkit used is WxPython. The statistical analyses are based on functions available through the SciPy stats module.

== Statistics features - workflows ==
Users are guided through the selection of the appropriate basic statistical methods and assignment of the basic statistical on the table column of the data that should be analyzed. The features available within SOFA for statistical analysis are limited compared to those found in Open Source R Statistics Software, which contains a large repository of statistics packages.

== Evaluating Accuracy ==
One paper compared the results of frequencies, means, correlations and regression from a number of free to use menu driven statistical packages, including SOFA, and found all of the packages produced about the same results.

== See also ==
- Comparison of statistical packages
- List of statistical packages
- List of open-source software for mathematics
