= RKWard =

Integrated development environment for R

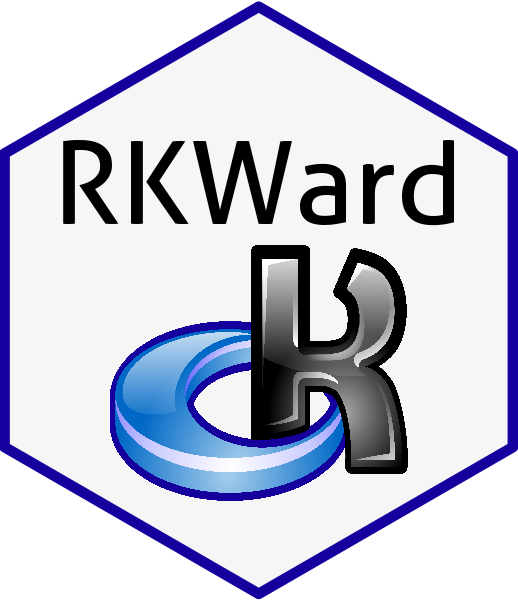

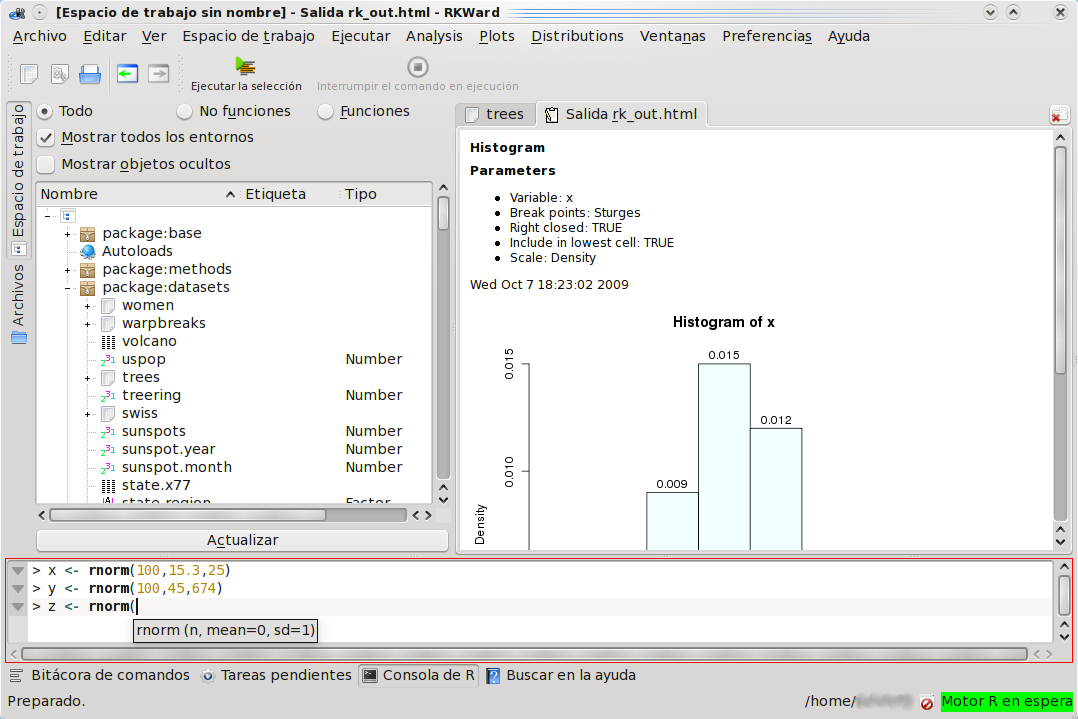
- RKWard screenshot
- Developer: RKWard community
- Stable release: 0.8.3 / April 24, 2026; 6 months ago
- Written in: C++, ECMAScript
- Operating system: BSD, Linux, macOS, Unix, Windows
- Type: Statistical software
- License: GNU General Public License
- Website: rkward.kde.org
- Repository: invent.kde.org/education/rkward

RKWard is a transparent front-end to the R programming language, a scripting-language with a strong focus on statistics functions. RKWard tries to combine the power of the R language with the ease of use of commercial statistical packages.

RKWard is written in C++ and although it can run in numerous environments, it was designed for and integrates the KDE desktop environment with the Qt (software) libraries.

== Features ==
RKWard's features include

- Spreadsheet-like data editor
- Syntax highlighting, code folding and code completion
- Data import (e.g. SPSS, Stata, CSV and Excel through package `rio`)
- Plot preview and browsable history
- R package management
- Workspace browser
- GUI dialogs for all kinds of statistics and plots

=== Interface ===
RKWard aims to be easy to use, both for people with deep knowledge of R, and for users who, although they have experience in statistics, are not familiar with the language. The application design offers the possibility of using the graphic tools as well as ignoring many of them and using the program as integrated development environment.

It includes a workspace viewer, which gives access to packages, functions, and variables loaded by R or imported from other sources. It also has a file viewer, and data set editing windows, display of the contents of the variables, help, command log, and HTML output.

Furthermore, it also offers components that help in code editing and direct order execution, such as the script window and the R console, where one can enter complete commands or programs as one would in the original R text interface. Likewise, it provides additional help such as syntax coloring documentation of functions while writing, and includes the feature of capturing graphs or emerging dialogs produced by offering additional options for handling, saving, and exporting them.

In recent versions, RKWard includes integration with RMarkdown such as highlighting, preview, and exporting. It has also included an integration with git for projects version control.

=== Package Management ===
The R package management is carried out through a configuration dialog that allows one to either automatically (because a plug-in requires it) or manually install new packages from the repository's official project, update existing ones, delete them, or upload/download them from the workspace.

== State of development ==
RKWard is under constant development, with periodic releases of new versions and add-ons contributed by its users. Currently, its developers already offer a stable version for Windows systems along with KDE.

== See also ==
- Comparison of statistical packages
- R interfaces
