= Gretl =

Open-source statistical computer software

gretl

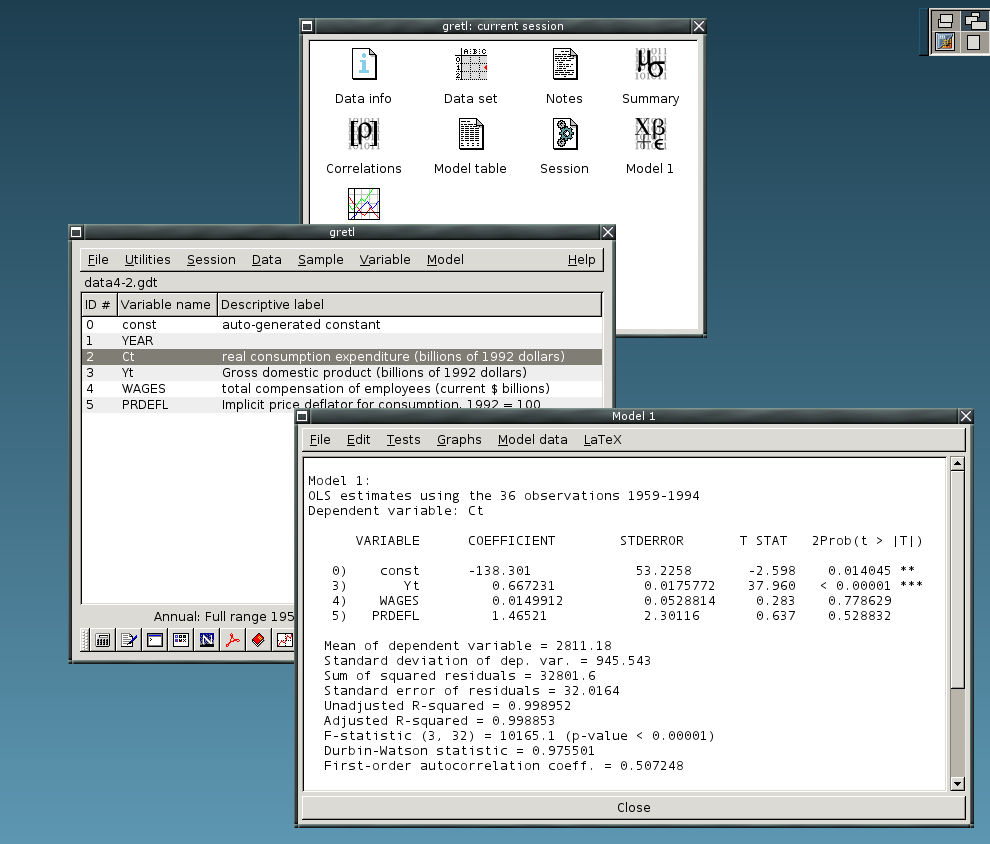
- Screenshot of gretl
- Developer: the gretl team
- Initial release: 31 January 2000; 26 years ago
- Stable release: 2024c / 22 October 2024; 19 months ago
- Preview release: Through git
- Written in: C
- Operating system: Cross-platform
- Available in: Multilingual (11)
- Type: Statistical software
- License: GNU GPLv3
- Website: gretl.sourceforge.net
- Repository: sourceforge.net/p/gretl/git/

gretl is computer software, an open-source statistical package, mainly for econometrics. The name is an acronym for Gnu Regression, Econometrics and Time-series Library.

It has both a graphical user interface (GUI) and a command-line interface. It is written in C, uses GTK+ as widget toolkit for creating its GUI, and calls gnuplot for generating graphs. The native scripting language of gretl is known as hansl (see below); it can also be used together with TRAMO/SEATS, R, Stata, Python, Octave, Ox and Julia.

It includes natively all the basic statistical techniques employed in contemporary Econometrics and Time-Series Analysis. Additional estimators and tests are available via user-contributed function packages, which are written in hansl. Output from gretl can be exported as LaTeX files.

gretl is available in English, Albanian, Basque, Bulgarian, Catalan, Chinese, Czech, French, Galician, German, Greek, Italian, Polish, European and Brazilian Portuguese, Romanian, Russian, Spanish, Turkish and Ukrainian. Gretl has been reviewed several times in the Journal of Applied Econometrics, and later in the Australian Economic Review.

A review also appeared in the Journal of Statistical Software in 2008. Since then, the journal has published several articles in which gretl is used to implement various statistical techniques.

== Supported data formats ==
gretl offers its own fully documented, XML-based data format.

It can also import ASCII, CSV, databank, EViews, Excel, Gnumeric, GNU Octave, JMulTi, OpenDocument spreadsheets, PcGive, RATS 4, SAS xport, SPSS, and Stata files. Since version 2020c, the GeoJSON and Shapefile formats are also supported, for thematic map creation.

It can export to Stata, GNU Octave, R, CSV, JMulTi, and PcGive file formats.

== hansl ==
Gretl has its own scripting language, called hansl (which is a recursive acronym for Hansl's A Neat Scripting Language).

Hansl is a Turing-complete, interpreted programming language, featuring loops, conditionals, user-defined functions and complex data structures. It can be considered a domain-specific language for econometrics. Like other scientifically oriented programming languages, such as MATLAB and Julia, matrices are supported natively as a primitive variable type.

A simple example of hansl:

matrix A = {1, 2 ; 3, 4}
matrix B = [[Invertible matrix|inv]](A)
matrix C = A*B

print A B C

loop i=-3..3
    [[printf]] "[[Phi]](%d) = %7.3f\n", i, [[Cumulative distribution function|cdf]](N, i)
endloop

Running the above code produces

A (2 x 2)

  1   2
  3   4

B (2 x 2)

    -2      1
   1.5   -0.5

C (2 x 2)

      1.0000       0.0000
  8.8818e-16       1.0000

Phi(-3) =   0.001
Phi(-2) =   0.023
Phi(-1) =   0.159
Phi( 0) =   0.500
Phi( 1) =   0.841
Phi( 2) =   0.977
Phi( 3) =   0.999

== Random Number Generation ==
Random Number Generation (RNG) in gretl has been examined and tested in Yalta & Schreiber (2012). The authors conclude "Our results show that the RNG related procedures in gretl are implemented soundly and perform well in the three crush test suites of the TestU01".

== Gretl as a teaching tool ==
Due to its libre nature and the breadth of econometric techniques it contains, gretl is widely used for teaching econometrics, from the undergraduate level onwards. Datasets in gretl format are available for several popular textbooks.

The following is a list of textbooks that use gretl as their software of choice:

- Dougherty, Christopher Introduction to Econometrics (Oxford University Press)
- Kufel, Tadeusz Ekonometria (Wydawnictwo Naukowe PWN); in Polish (Russian version also available)
- Kivedal, Bjørnar Applied Statistics and Econometrics (Springer)
- Bismans, Francis J. and Damette, Olivier Dynamic Econometrics. Models and Applications (Springer)

In addition, a free supplement to Hill, Griffiths and Lim Principles of Econometrics (Wiley) is available.

== See also ==
- Comparison of statistical packages
- R (programming language)
