= XploRe =

Statistics software

XploRe was a commercial statistics software package, developed by the German software company MD*Tech around Prof. Dr. Wolfgang Härdle. XploRe has been discontinued in 2008, the last version, 4.8, is available for download at no cost. The user interacted with the software via the XploRe programming language, which is derived from the C programming language. Individual XploRe programs were called Quantlets.

== Functions ==
Besides the standard functions for one- and multidimensional data analysis the focus was on non- and semiparametric modelling and the statistics of financial markets.

- Kernel density estimation and regression (kernel regression)
- Single index models
- Generalized linear and additive models (GLM and GAM)
- Value at risk (VaR) and implied volatilities

== XploRe Quantlet Client ==
With the XploRe Quantlet Client users were able to run XploRe as Java applet in a web browser. The applet sent the user commands via a TCP/IP based communication protocol to the XploRe Quantlet Server, which computed the necessary results and sent them back to the client.

This technology was also used to enrich (electronic) books with interactive examples.

== See also ==
- Comparison of statistical packages

== Literature ==
- Härdle, Klinke, Müller. XploRe Learning Guide. Springer. ISBN 3-540-66207-3
- Härdle, Klinke, Müller. XploRe Applications Guide. Springer. ISBN 3-540-67545-0
