= Jamovi =

Statistical analysis package based on R

jamovi
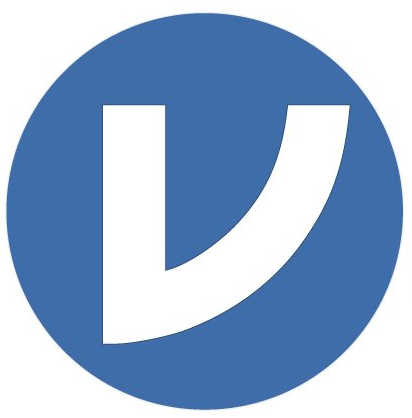

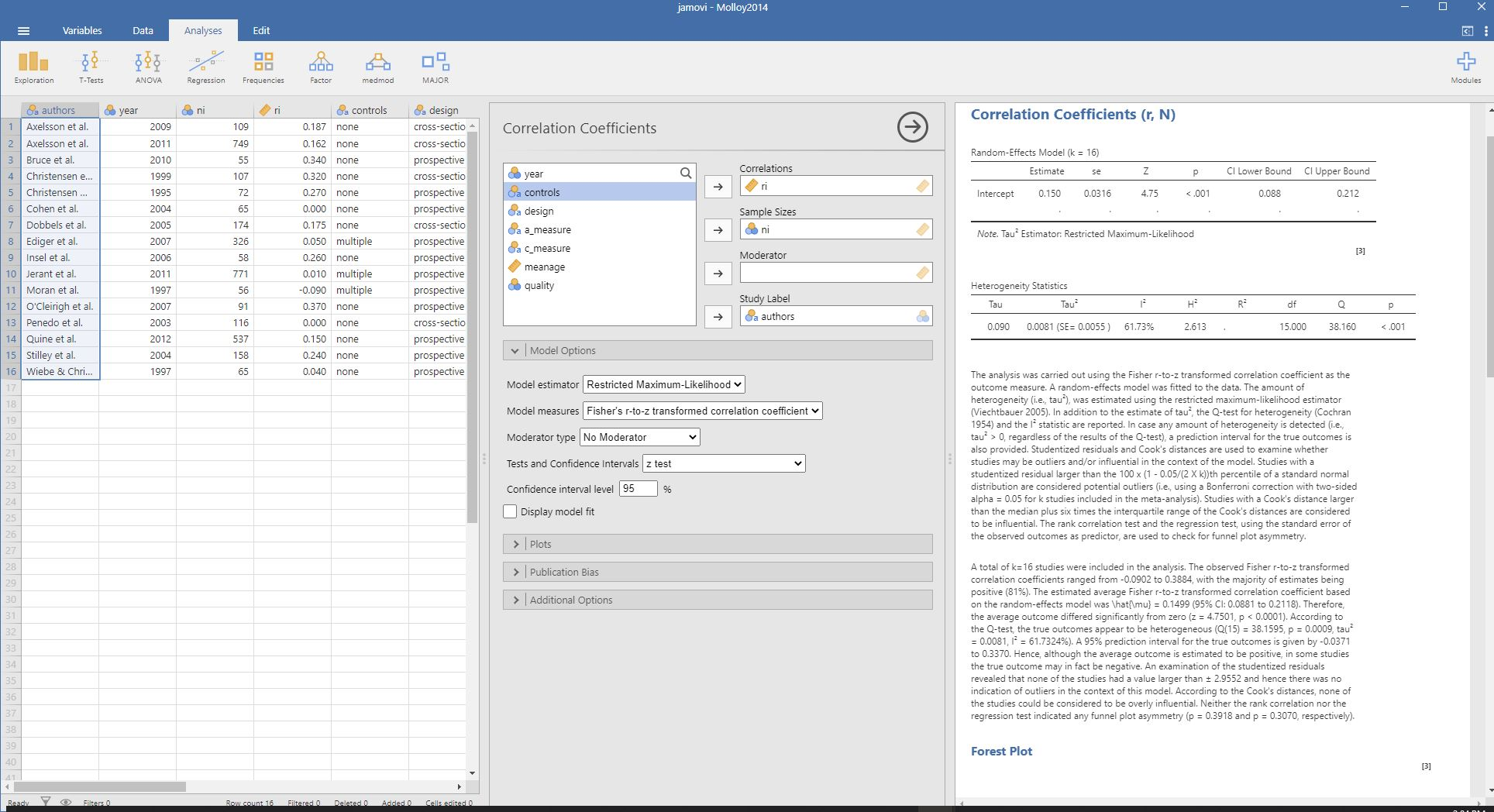
- Stable release: 28.14.0 / 21 October 2026; 26 days ago
- Written in: C++, R, JavaScript, Python
- Operating system: Microsoft Windows, macOS, Linux, ChromeOS
- Available in: Catalan, Danish, German, English, Spanish, French, Italian, Japanese, Kazakh, Nynorsk, Bokmål, Polish, Portuguese, Russian, Swedish, Ukrainian, Simplified Chinese, Classical Chinese, Hebrew
- Type: Statistics
- License: GNU Affero General Public License and GNU General Public License
- Website: www.jamovi.org
- Repository: github.com/jamovi

jamovi (stylised in all lower-case) is a free and open-source computer program for data analysis and performing statistical tests. The core developers of jamovi are Jonathon Love, Damian Dropmann, and Ravi Selker, who were developers for the JASP project.

== Software ==
jamovi is an open source graphical user interface for the R programming language. It is used in statistical research, especially as a tool for ANOVA (analysis of variance) and to understand statistical inference. It also can be used for linear regression, mixed models and Bayesian models.

Data is entered into a spreadsheet interface that can be imported into jamovi. If data are changed, all calculations and analyses affected by the change are automatically updated. The software includes a multinomial test to determine whether observed data differs from researchers' predictions.

One paper compared the results of frequencies, means, correlations and regression from a number of free to use menu driven statistical packages, including jamovi, and found all of the packages produced about the same results.

== Extendibility ==
jamovi comes with a basic library of statistical and graphical procedures. In addition, users can install modules from a library of community created open source add-on modules to extend the package's capabilities. These modules are written in the R programming language and make use of the jmv and jmvtools libraries to create the interface and display code. Numerous modules exist and can be accessed in the curated library within jamovi. Over 40 modules have been created by the jamovi community and extend the functionality of the program. These additional analyses include agreement and reliability analyses mediation models, meta-analysis, power analysis, psychometrics, structural equation models, survival analysis, and likelihood/evidential analyses.

== See also ==
- Comparison of statistical packages
