= BLUPF90 =

The BLUPF90 family of programs is a statistical software package used in quantitative genetics for animal and plant breeding. It can fit mixed models using restricted maximum likelihood as well as Gibbs sampling to estimate variance components, and predict breeding values via best linear unbiased prediction (BLUP).

Coded in Fortran, it can perform genomic selection on hundreds of thousands of genotyped individuals.

Compiled versions of BLUPF90 are freely available for research, and can be used on Linux, Microsoft Windows and Mac OS X. There also exists an add-on to R (programming language).
