= MedCalc =

- Developer: MedCalc Software
- Stable release: 22.001 / May 12, 2023; 3 years ago
- Operating system: Windows
- Type: Statistical analysis
- License: proprietary
- Website: www.medcalc.org

MedCalc is a statistical software package designed for the biomedical sciences. The first version of MedCalc, for MS-DOS, was released in April 1993, then a Windows version in November 1996.

It has an integrated spreadsheet for data input and can import files in several formats (Excel, SPSS, CSV).

MedCalc includes basic parametric and non-parametric statistical procedures and graphs such as descriptive statistics, ANOVA, Mann–Whitney test, Wilcoxon test, χ^{2} test, correlation, linear as well as non-linear regression, logistic regression, and multivariate statistics.

Survival analysis includes Cox regression (Proportional hazards model) and Kaplan–Meier survival analysis.

Procedures for method evaluation and method comparison include ROC curve analysis, Bland–Altman plot, as well as Deming and Passing–Bablok regression.

The software also includes reference interval estimation, meta-analysis and sample size calculations.

Version 15.2 introduced a user-interface in English, Chinese (simplified and traditional), French, German, Italian, Japanese, Korean, Polish, Portuguese (Brazilian), Russian and Spanish.

== Reviews ==
- Stephan C, Wesseling S, Schink T, Jung K. “Comparison of eight computer programs for receiver-operating characteristic analysis.” Clinical Chemistry 2003;49:433-439. doi:10.1373/49.3.433
- Lukic IK. “MedCalc Version 7.0.0.2. Software Review.” Croatian Medical Journal 2003;44:120-121.
- Garber C. “MedCalc Software for Statistics in Medicine. Software review.” Clinical Chemistry, 1998;44:1370.
- Petrovecki M. “MedCalc for Windows. Software Review.” Croatian Medical Journal, 1997;38:178.

== See also ==
- List of statistical packages
- Comparison of statistical packages
