= Statgraphics =

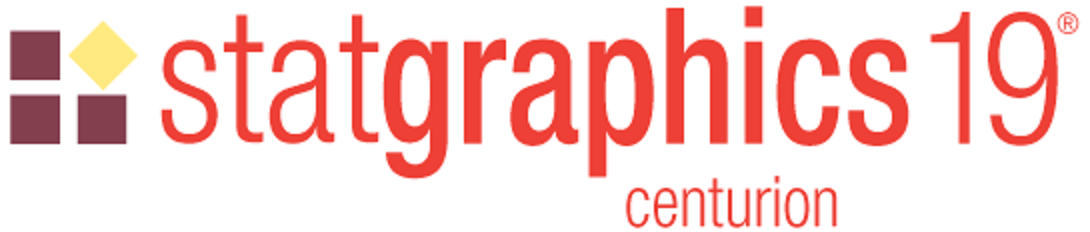
- Developer(s): Statgraphics Technologies, Inc.
- Initial release: 1980
- Stable release: 19.5.01 / April, 2023
- Operating system: Windows
- Type: Statistics Package
- License: Proprietary
- Website: statgraphics.com

Statgraphics is a statistics package that performs and explains basic and advanced statistical functions.

== History ==
The software was created in 1980 by Dr. Neil W. Polhemus while on the Princeton University School of Engineering and Applied Science faculty as a teaching tool for his statistics students. It was made available to the public in 1982, becoming an early example of data science software designed for use on the PC.

== Software ==
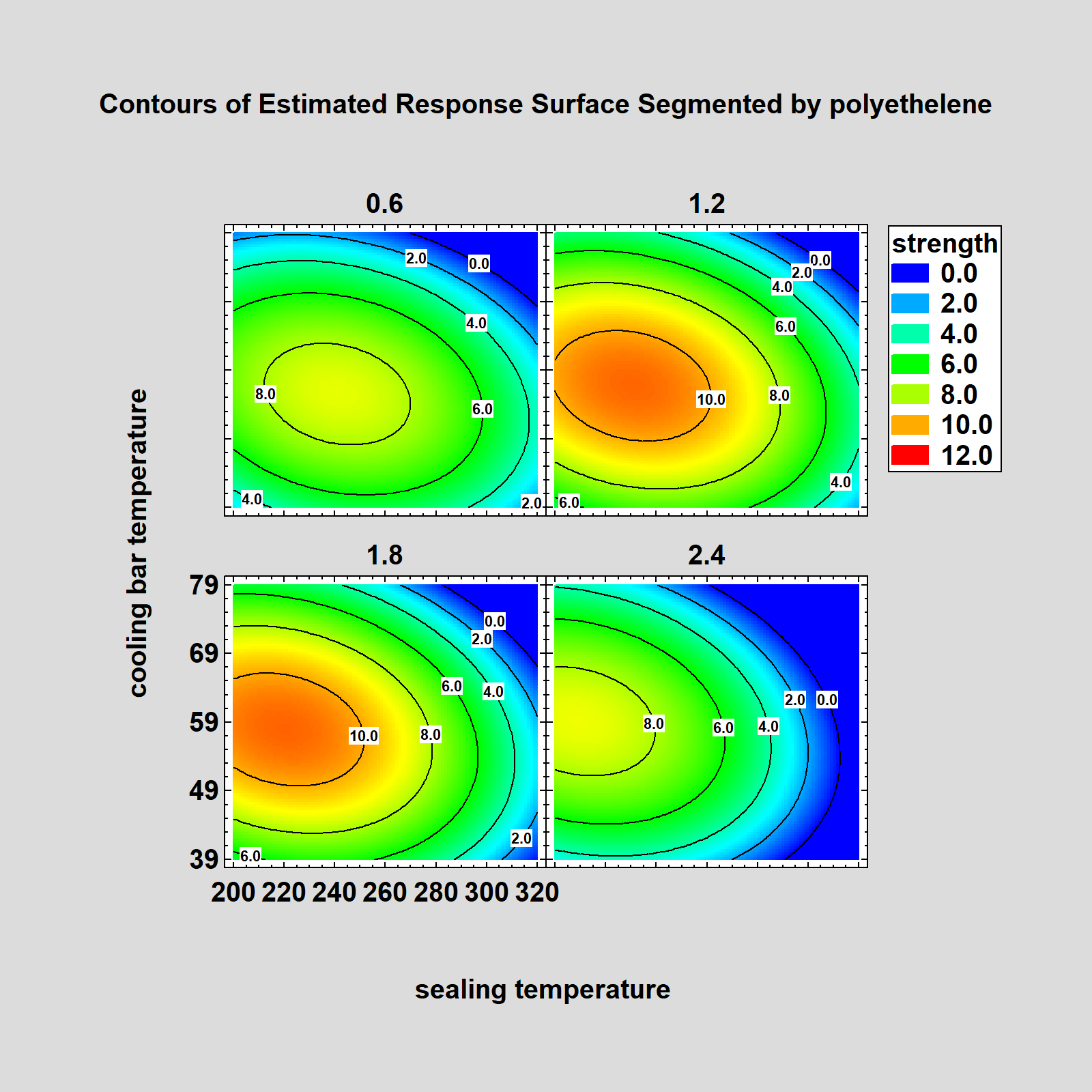
Trellis plot

The flagship version of Statgraphics is Statgraphics Centurion, a Windows desktop application with capabilities for regression analysis, ANOVA, multivariate statistics, Design of Experiments, statistical process control, life data analysis, machine learning, and data visualization. The data analysis procedures include descriptive statistics, hypothesis testing, regression analysis, analysis of variance, survival analysis, time series analysis and forecasting, sample size determination, multivariate methods, machine learning and Monte Carlo techniques. The SPC menu includes many procedures for quality assessment, capability analysis, control charts, measurement systems analysis, and acceptance sampling. The program also features a DOE Wizard that creates and analyzes statistically designed experiments.

== Applications ==
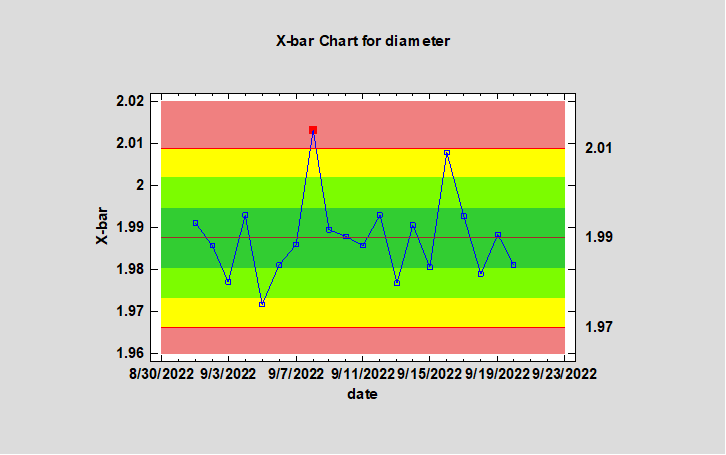
Control chart with zones

Statgraphics is frequently used for Six Sigma process improvement. The program has also been used in various health and nutrition-related studies. The software is heavily used in manufacturing chemicals, pharmaceuticals, medical devices, automobiles, food and consumer goods. It is also widely used in mining, environmental studies, and basic R&D.

== Distribution ==
Statgraphics is distributed by Statgraphics Technologies, Inc., a privately held company based in The Plains, Virginia.

== See also ==
- List of statistical packages
- Comparison of statistical packages
- List of information graphics software
