= Analyse-it =

- Developer: Analyse-it Software, Ltd.
- Stable release: 6.15 (Win) / 2026
- Operating system: Windows
- Type: Statistical analysis
- License: Proprietary
- Website: analyse-it.com

Analyse-it is a statistical analysis add-in for Microsoft Excel. Analyse-it is the successor to Astute, developed in 1992 for Excel 4 and the first statistical analysis add-in for Microsoft Excel. Analyse-it provides a range of standard parametric and non-parametric procedures, including Descriptive statistics, ANOVA, ANCOVA, Mann–Whitney, Wilcoxon, chi-square, correlation, linear regression, logistic regression, polynomial regression and advanced model fitting, principal component analysis, and factor analysis.

Analyse-it Method Validation edition provides the standard Analyse-it statistical analyses above, plus procedures for method evaluation, validation and demonstration, including Bland–Altman bias plots, Linear regression, Weighted Linear regression, Deming regression, Weighted Deming regression and Passing Bablok for method comparison, Precision, Linearity, Detection limits, Reference intervals and Receiver operating characteristic analysis supporting Delong, Delong Clarke-Pearson comparisons.(see references below). Version 4.00 added support for CLSI guidelines EP05, EP06, EP09, EP10, EP12, EP15, EP17, EP21, EP24 (formerly GP10-A), and EP28 (formerly C28-A3C).

Analyse-it Medical edition provides the standard Analyse-it statistical analyses above, plus Bland–Altman bias plots, Reference intervals and Receiver operating characteristic analysis supporting Delong, Delong Clarke-Pearson comparisons.(see references below).

Analyse-it Quality Control & Improvement edition provides the standard Analyse-it statistical analyses above, plus procedures for statistical process control, including Shewhart, Levey-Jennings, CUSUM, and EWMA control charts, process capability analysis, and pareto analysis.

Analyse-it is compatible with Microsoft Excel 365 and 2013 onwards (both 32- and 64-bit versions).

== Screenshots from Analyse-it ==
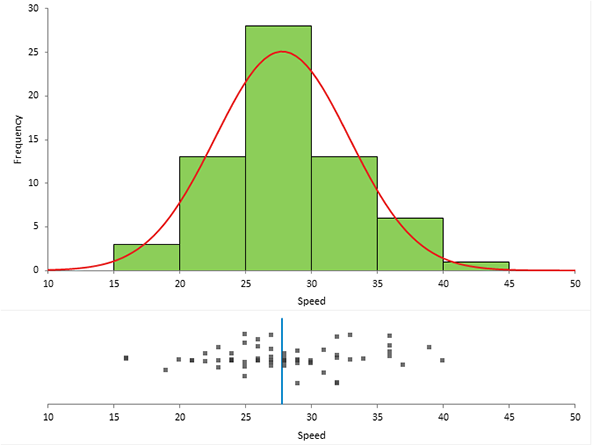
Histogram and dot plot

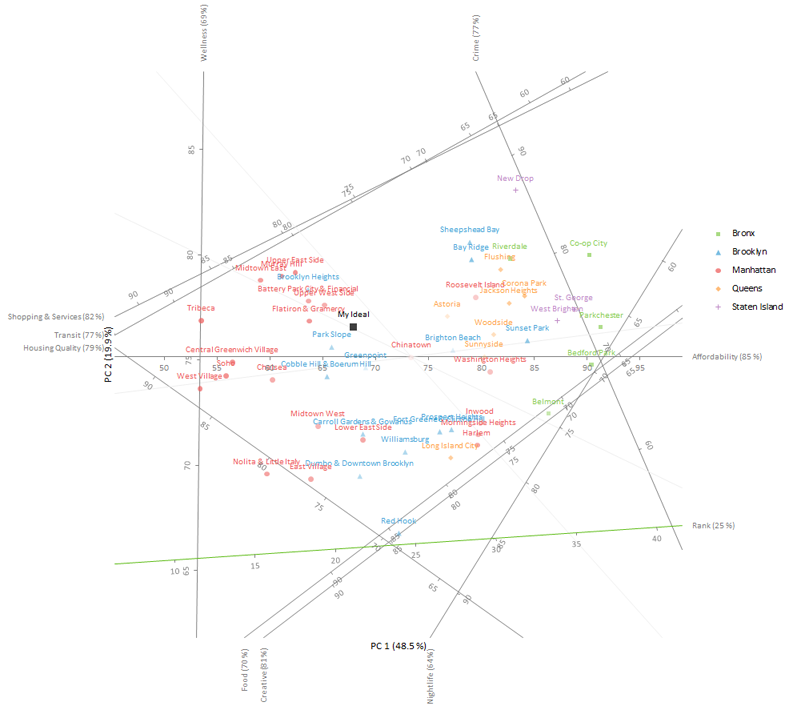
PCA biplot

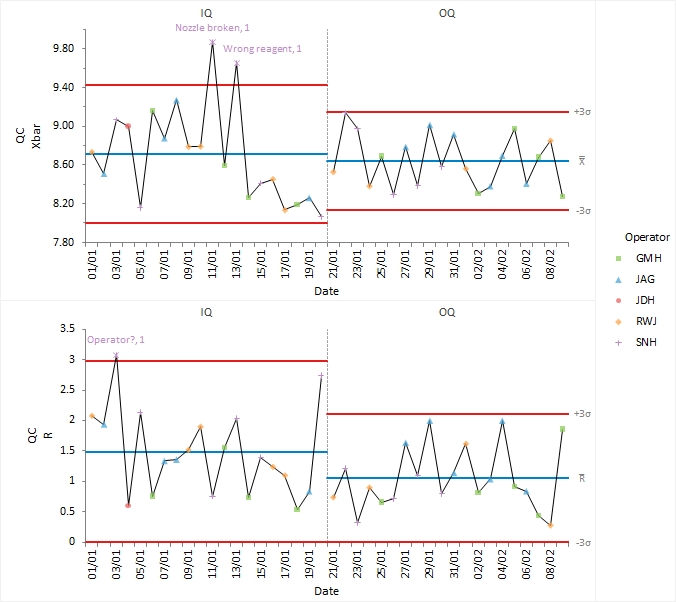
SPC control charts

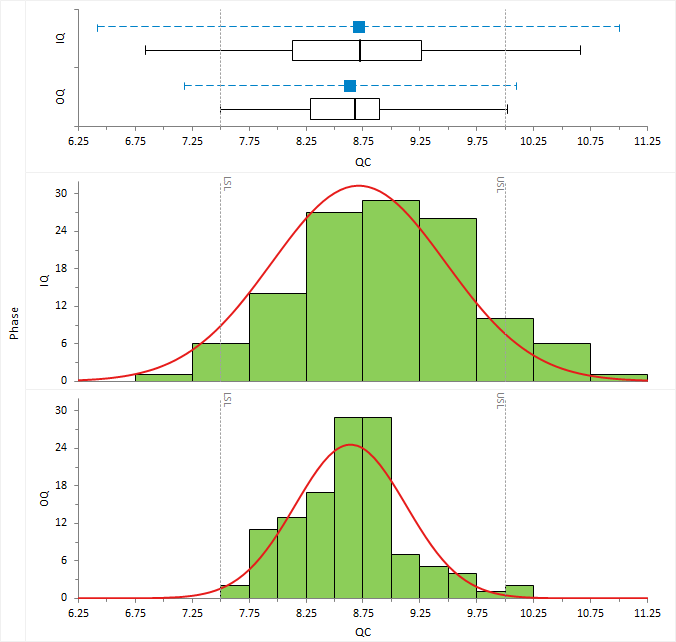
Capability analysis

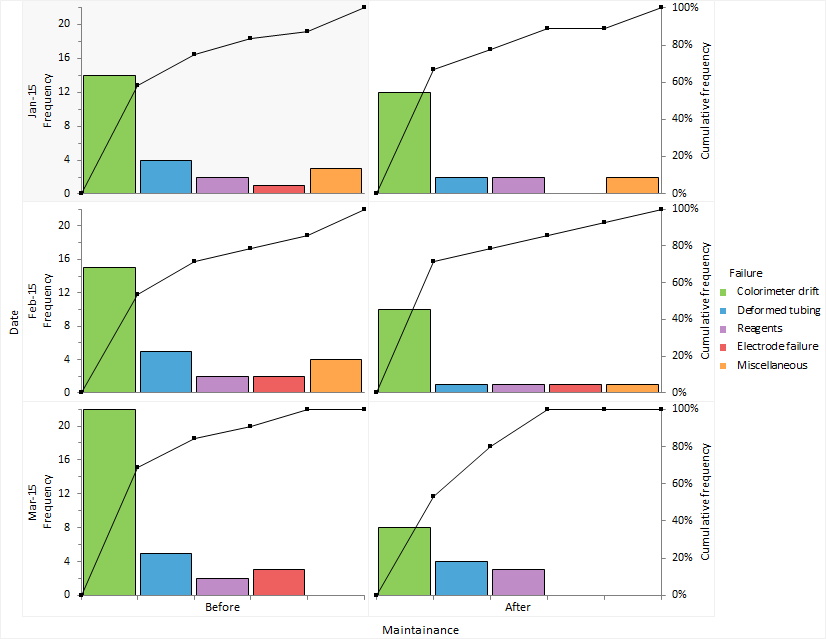
Pareto plots

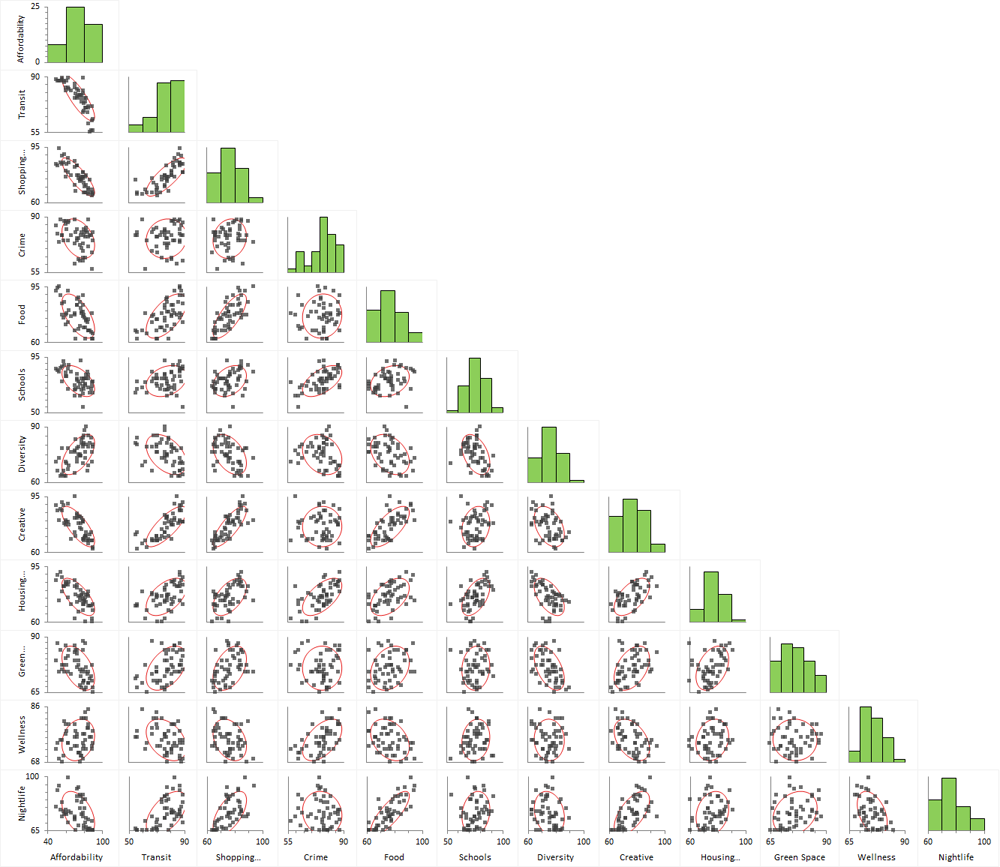
Scatter matrix

== See also ==
- List of statistical packages
- Comparison of statistical packages
