= WINKS =

Statistical analysis software

Windows KwikStat (WINKS) is a statistical analysis software package. It was first marketed in 1988 as a shareware program under the name KWIKSTAT by the Cedar Hill–based company TexaSoft for DOS. It was originally programmed in GW-BASIC and was capable of calculating chi-squares, crosstabs, F-distributions, five-number summaries, medians, p-values, regressions, standard deviations, and variances. It was ported to Windows in 1996, where it was given the name Windows KwikStat, or simply WINKS.

Starting with version 4.0 of KWIKSTAT and carried onto WINKS, the software was sold in two editions: the Basic Edition includes data handling and statistical analysis that include basic statistical procedures and the Professional Edition include a number of more advanced procedures. A special Time Series version of WINKS is available in support of the book Applied Time Series Analysis from CRC Press.

== Major statistical procedures ==
Major statistical procedures included in KWIKSTAT and WINKS include:

- Descriptive statistics
- Grubbs outlier test
- t-tests: single, independent, and paired
- Multiple regression, simple, stepwise, polynomial, all-possible
- ANOVA, simple, multi-way with multiple comparisons, 95% CI
- Analysis of covariance
- Repeated measures ANOVA
- Correlation: Pearson, Spearman & Partial
- Mantel–Haenzel
- Non-parametric tests
- Kruskal–Wallis
- Mann–Whitney
- Friedman's test (repeated measures)
- Multiple comparisons on most group comparison tests
- Dunnett's test
- Cross-tabulation, chi-square, likelihood ratio
- Goodness-of-fit
- z-scores
- Survival analysis
- Bland–Altman plots
- Inter-rater reliability
- Kappa (weighted)
- Fisher's exact test 2×2 tables
- Cramér's V, phi
- McNemar's, Cochran's Q
- Logistic regression
- Odds ratios
- Sensitivity and specificity
- ROC curves
- Time series analysis
- Statistical and QC charts and graphs
- Forest plots
