= Primer-E Primer =

PRIMER
- Developer: Plymouth Routines in Multivariate Ecology Research
- Stable release: 7
- Operating system: Windows
- Type: Numerical analysis
- License: Proprietary
- Website: https://www.primer-e.com/

Plymouth Routines In Multivariate Ecological Research (PRIMER) is a statistical package that is a collection of specialist univariate, multivariate, and graphical routines for analyzing species sampling data for community ecology. Types of data analyzed are typically species abundance, biomass, presence/absence, and percent area cover, among others. It is primarily used in the scientific community for ecological and environmental studies.

Multivariate routines include:

- grouping (CLUSTER)
- sorting (MDS)
- principal component identification (PCA)
- hypothesis testing (ANOSIM)
- sample discrimination (SIMPER)
- trend correlation (BEST)
- comparisons (RELATE)
- diversity, dominance, and distribution calculating
- Permutational multivariate analysis of variance (PERMANOVA)

Routines can be resource intensive due to their non-parametric and permutation-based nature. Programmed in the VB.Net environment.

== See also ==
- Comparison of statistical packages
- List of statistical packages
