= StatCrunch =

Statistical software application

- Original author: Webster West
- Developer: Pearson Education
- Release: 1997; 29 years ago
- Stable release: April 2018 / April 3, 2018; 8 years ago
- Operating system: Web application (Windows, OS X, Linux, iOS, Android)
- Type: Statistical analysis
- License: Proprietary software
- Website: www.statcrunch.com

StatCrunch is a web-based statistical software application from Pearson Education. StatCrunch was originally created for use in college statistics courses. As a full-featured statistics package, it is now also used for research and for other statistical analysis purposes.

== History ==
American statistics professor Webster West created StatCrunch in 1997. Over the next 19 years West assisted by others added many more statistical procedures and graphing capabilities, and made user interface improvements.

In 2005, West received two awards for StatCrunch: the CAUSEweb Resource of the Year Award and the MERLOT Classics Award. In 2013, the StatCrunch Java code was rewritten in JavaScript in order to avoid Java browser security problems, and so that it would run on iOS and Android. In 2015, new ways of importing data were added, including importing multi-page data directly from Wikipedia tables and other Web sources, and also importing with drag-and-drop for various data formats.

In 2016, StatCrunch was acquired by Pearson Education, which had already been serving as the primary distributor of StatCrunch for several years.

== Software ==
A StatCrunch license is included with many of Pearson's statistical textbooks. Because StatCrunch is a web application, it works on multiple platforms, including Windows, macOS, iOS, and Android.

Data in StatCrunch is represented in a "data table" view, which is similar to a spreadsheet view, but unlike spreadsheets, the cells in a data table can only contain numbers or text. Formulas cannot be stored in these cells. There are many ways to import data into StatCrunch. Data can be typed directly into cells in the data table. Entire blocks of data may be cut-and-pasted into the data table. Text files (.csv, .txt, etc.) and Microsoft Excel files (.xls and .xlsx) can be drag-and-dropped into the data table. Data can be pulled into StatCrunch directly from Wikipedia tables or other Web tables, including multi-page tables. Data can be loaded directly from Google Drive and Dropbox. Shared data sets saved by other StatCrunch community users can be searched for by title or keyword and opened in a data table.

Graphs, results, and reports created by StatCrunch can be shared with other users, in addition to the sharing of data sets. StatCrunch has a library of data transformation functions. StatCrunch can also recode and reorganize data. All data is stored in memory, and all processing happens on the client, so response is fast, even with large data sets.

StatCrunch can interact with multiple graphs simultaneously. If a user selects a data point on one graph, then that same data point is highlighted on all other displayed graphs.

In addition to standard statistical and graphing procedures, StatCrunch has a collection of about forty "applets" which illustrate statistical concepts interactively.

== See also ==
- List of statistical packages
- Comparison of statistical packages
