= Shazam (econometrics software) =

Econometrics and statistics package

- Original author: Ken White
- Developer: SHAZAM Analytics Ltd
- Initial release: 1977; 49 years ago
- Stable release: 11.5 / November 2022; 3 years ago
- Written in: C++, FORTRAN, C#, .NET
- Operating system: Windows
- Type: programming language, econometric software, statistical analysis
- License: proprietary
- Website: www.econometrics.com

Shazam is a comprehensive econometrics and statistics package for estimating, testing, simulating and forecasting many types of econometrics and statistical models. SHAZAM was originally created in 1977 by Kenneth White.

== Data management ==
All SHAZAM editions read and write both fixed and free format text formats using the READ and FORMAT statements. Data can be stored by observation (row) or by variable (column) with or without variable names. Through the supplied Windows Environment formats such as comma-separated values (CSV), Microsoft Excel (both XLS and XLSX) may also be read and written.

SHAZAM Professional Edition contains comprehensive data import capabilities through its Data Connector and SQL editor allowing the import of machine data source such as tab, space or comma separated text formats, other file-based proprietary binary formats (including various Microsoft Excel formats) as well as Microsoft Access or any other LAN, WAN or internet data source for which the user has a driver on their system. In addition SHAZAM can import data from Database Management Systems (DBMS) and SHAZAM ships with drivers for most common data Database Management Systems.

== Extensibility ==
SHAZAM is extensible through the development of SHAZAM Procedures that can be included or reused in SHAZAM command files. Numerous SHAZAM Procedures have been written and are available from the SHAZAM Website or from many sites throughout the internet.

== Editions ==
SHAZAM is currently available in four editions. SHAZAM Command Line Edition (SHAZAMD and SHAZAMQ) are text user interface versions that allow batch processing. They operate in double and quad precisions. SHAZAM Standard Edition (SHAZAMW) adds a native Windows application that incorporates a multiple document interface (MDI) interface including command, data, matrix, graph editors and a Workspace viewer along with integrated online help, samples and examples. SHAZAM Professional Edition (SHAZAMP) adds menu and wizard driven facilities for executing SHAZAM techniques, a data connector with SQL editor as well as an integrated debugger.

== See also ==
- Comparison of statistical packages
- List of statistical packages
