= Genstat =

Statistical software

- Original author: John Nelder
- Developer: VSN International (VSNi)
- Stable release: 23.1 / August 2023; 3 years ago
- Operating system: Microsoft Windows
- Available in: English
- Type: Statistical package
- Licence: Proprietary
- Website: www.vsni.co.uk/software/genstat

Genstat (General Statistics) is a statistical software package with data analysis capabilities, particularly in the field of agriculture. It was developed in 1968 by the Rothamsted Research in the United Kingdom and was designed to provide modular design, linear mixed models and graphical functions. It was developed and distributed by VSN International (VSNi), which was owned by The Numerical Algorithms Group and Rothamsted Research.

Genstat is used in a number of research areas, including plant science, forestry, animal science, and medicine.

== See also ==
- ASReml: a statistical package which fits linear mixed models to large data sets with complex variance models, using Residual Maximum Likelihood (REML)
