= The Unscrambler =

The Unscrambler X
- Developer: Aspen Technology
- Operating system: Microsoft Windows
- Type: Multivariate statistics, Multivariate Analysis, Design of Experiments Chemometrics, Spectroscopy, Sensory analysis
- License: Proprietary
- Website: www.aspentech.com/en/products/apm/aspen-unscrambler

The Unscrambler X is a commercial software product for multivariate data analysis, used for calibration of multivariate data which is often in the application of analytical data such as near infrared spectroscopy and Raman spectroscopy, and development of predictive models for use in real-time spectroscopic analysis of materials. The software was originally developed in 1986 by Harald Martens and later by CAMO Software. After the acquisition of CAMO by Aspen Technology in 2020, Unscrambler is now owned by Aspen.

== Functionality ==
The Unscrambler X was an early adaptation of the use of partial least squares (PLS). Other techniques supported include principal component analysis (PCA), 3-way PLS, multivariate curve resolution, design of experiments, supervised classification, unsupervised classification and cluster analysis.

The software is used in spectroscopy (IR, NIR, Raman, etc.), chromatography, and process applications in research and non-destructive quality control systems in pharmaceutical manufacturing, sensory analysis and the chemical industry.
