= LIMDEP =

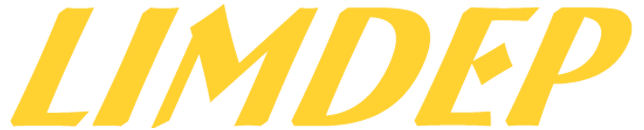

- LIMDEP on Microsoft Windows
- Original author: William H. Greene
- Developers: Econometric Software, Inc.
- Stable release: 11 / September 7, 2016
- Operating system: Windows
- Type: statistical analysis econometric analysis
- License: proprietary software
- Website: www.limdep.com

LIMDEP is an econometric and statistical software package with a variety of estimation tools. In addition to the core econometric tools for analysis of cross sections and time series, LIMDEP supports methods for panel data analysis, frontier and efficiency estimation and discrete choice modeling. The package also provides a programming language to allow the user to specify, estimate and analyze models that are not contained in the built in menus of model forms.

== History ==
LIMDEP was first developed in the early 1980s. Econometric Software, Inc. was founded in 1985 by William H. Greene. The program was initially developed as an easy-to-use tobit estimator—hence the name, LIMited DEPendent variable models. Econometric Software has continually expanded since the early 1980s and currently has locations in the United States and Australia.

The ongoing development of LIMDEP has been based partly on interaction and feedback from users and from the collaboration of many researchers. LIMDEP is used by researchers in universities, government institutions, and businesses.

LIMDEP has spun off a major suite of programs for the estimation of discrete choice models, NLOGIT, now a self standing superset of LIMDEP.

As of November 2024, the LIMDEP website states that "After 35 years of developing and providing pioneering tools for microeconometric analysis, Econometric Software, Inc. is closing its operations."

== User interface ==
The main functionality of the program is accessed through a command line interface. Command streams are provided to the program via scripts or as text processed in a text editing format. It also includes a graphical user interface within which all program features can be accessed via menus or command generating dialog boxes. All GUI command generators produce transportable scripts that can be reused and modified in the command editor.

== Data input, formats and storage ==
Any number of data sets may be analyzed simultaneously. Data are input via standard ASCII formats such as CSV, DIF and rectangular ASCII, as well as XLS, Stata DTA (some versions) and binary. Data may be exported in CSV, rectangular ASCII and binary formats. The native save format (LPJ) has not changed since the release of the Windows version in 1997. All versions may exchange data sets. Data storage and all computations are always in double precision. Active data set size limitation is imposed by the available memory.

== List server ==
LIMDEP supports a list server based discussion group. Anyone (users and interested nonusers) may subscribe to the list server. The list server is maintained at the University of Sydney.

== Models ==
There are model formulations for linear and nonlinear regression, robust estimation, discrete choice (including binary choice, ordered choice and unordered multinomial choice), censoring and truncation, sample selection, loglinear models, survival analysis, quantile regression (linear and count), panel data, stochastic frontier and data envelopment analysis, count data, and time series.

== Data Analysis ==
Analysis of a data set is done interactively in a set of windows. Program control may be from a pull down menu or in an unstructured session of instructions and manipulations. Estimation involves:

- Data management, including input from standard sources (such as Excel), transformations and sample controls
- Programming language, matrix algebra package and scientific calculator
- Random number generation, matrix for bootstrapping, Gibbs sampling and Monte Carlo simulation
- Graphical and numeric descriptive statistics analysis
- Optimization tools for maximum likelihood, GMM, or maximum simulated likelihood estimators
- Post estimation tools for simulation, hypothesis testing, and partial effects
- Computational methods that match the National Institute of Standards and Technology test problems

== Resources ==
The PDF documentation set includes reference guides for the operation, background econometrics, and sample applications.

== See also ==
- List of statistical packages
- Comparison of statistical packages
