= ADaMSoft =

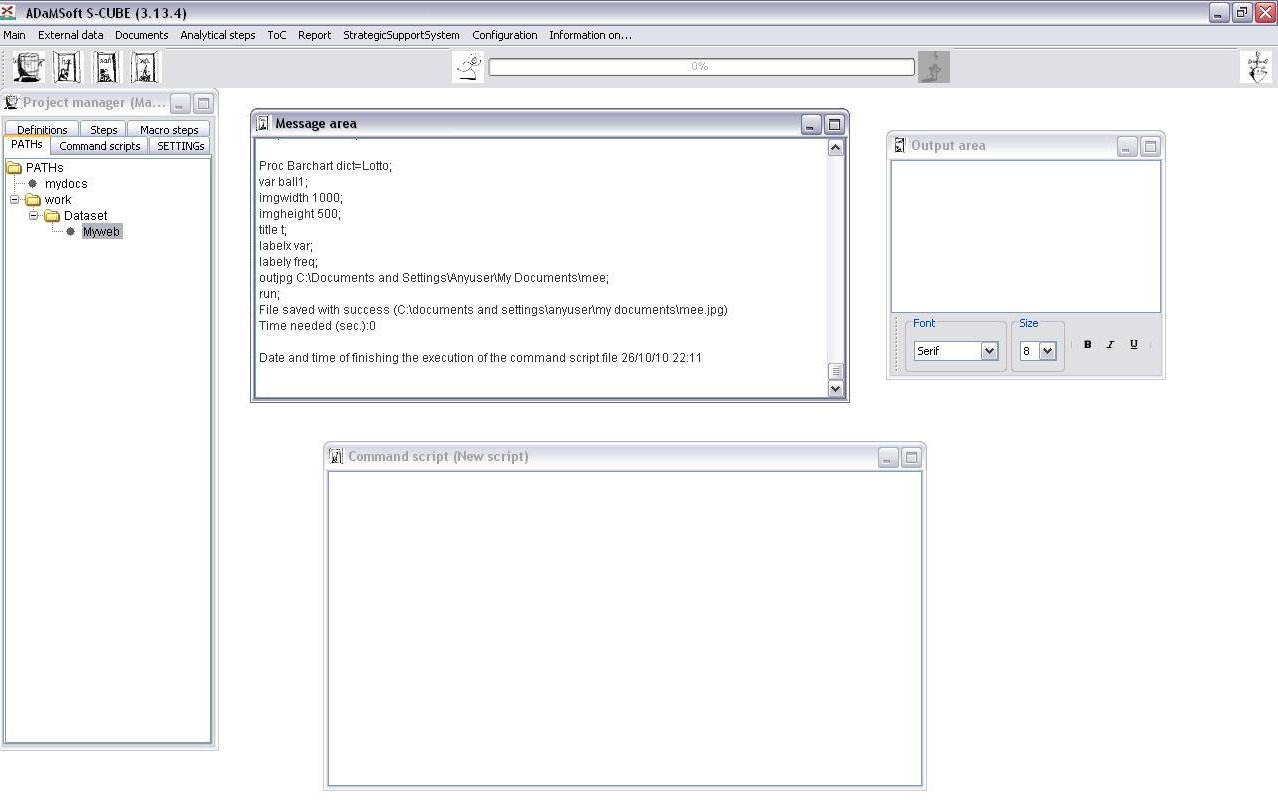
- ADaMSoft
- Developer: CASPUR statistical group
- Stable release: 3.31.1 / April 27, 2015; 11 years ago
- Written in: Java
- Operating system: Windows, Linux
- Type: Statistical analysis
- License: GNU General Public License
- Website: adamsoft.sourceforge.net

ADaMSoft is a free and open-source statistical software developed in Java and can run on any platform supporting Java.

== History ==
ADaMSoft was initially started by Marco Scarnò as a simple prototype of the statistical software developed by UNESCO and called WinIDAMS. Later it proved useful for several activities of the CASPUR statistical group (ADaMS group). The software was further developed until it became an interesting package which was tested and, finally, opened to the web community.

== Features ==
=== Statistical methods ===
ADaMSoft can perform a wide range of analytical methods:

- Neural Networks MLP
- Graphs
- Data Mining
- Linear regression
- Logistic regression
- Methods for Statistical classification
- Record linkage methods
- Contains algorithms for Decision trees
- Cluster analysis
- Data Editing and imputation
- Principal component analysis
- Correspondence analysis

=== Data sources ===
It can read/write statistical data values from various/to sources including:

- Text Files
- Excel Spreadsheets
- ODBC data sources
- MySQL
- Postgresql
- Oracle

=== Web Application Server ===
By using the ADaMSoft Web Application Server it is possible to use all the software facilities through the web; in other words to let that internet users can access to the ADaMSoft procedures without having it installed.
