= NCSS (statistical software) =

- Developer(s): NCSS, LLC
- Stable release: NCSS 2022
- Operating system: Windows
- Type: numerical analysis
- License: Proprietary software
- Website: www.ncss.com

NCSS is a statistics package produced and distributed by NCSS, LLC. Created in 1981 by Jerry L. Hintze, NCSS, LLC specializes in providing statistical analysis software to researchers, businesses, and academic institutions. It also produces PASS Sample Size Software which is used in scientific study planning and evaluation.

The NCSS package includes over 250 documented statistical and plot procedures. NCSS imports and exports all major spreadsheet, database, and statistical file formats.

== Major statistical topics in NCSS ==
- Analysis of Variance
- Appraisal Methods
- Charts and Graphs
- Correlation
- Cross Tabulation
- Curve Fitting
- Descriptive Statistics
- Design of Experiments
- Diagnostic Tests
- Forecasting
- General Linear Models
- Meta-Analysis
- Mixed Models
- Multivariate
- Proportions
- Quality Control
- Regression Analysis
- Reliability Analysis
- Repeated Measures
- ROC Curves
- Survival Analysis
- Time Series Analysis
- T-Tests

== See also ==
- List of statistical packages
- Comparison of statistical packages
