= ASReml =

Statistical software package

ASReml is a statistical software package for fitting linear mixed models using restricted maximum likelihood, a technique commonly used in plant and animal breeding and quantitative genetics as well as other fields. It is notable for its ability to fit very large and complex data sets efficiently, due to its use of the average information algorithm and sparse matrix methods.

It was originally developed by Arthur Gilmour.

ASREML can be used in Windows, Linux, and as an add-on to S-PLUS and R.
