= Databank format =

File format for economic time series data

A file format is a procedure to encode information for storage in a computer file. The databank format is an ASCII file format for time series econometric analysis. The format was popularized by MicroTSP.

The databank format is used for data of a fixed annual sample frequency (annual, quarterly, monthly) and for undated data. It is supported by TSP, EViews, and many other econometric applications. Traditionally the name of the file ends with extension .db.

By inspection, the databank file is seen to be an ASCII text file containing a single data series. A databank file is formatted in a linewise structure. Initial comment lines begin with a quote. For dated series, the next three lines specify the frequency, start date, and end date. (For undated series, the next two lines specify the start index and end index.) The remaining lines are data: one observation per line, or NA if missing.

Closely related is the open databank format: a modest extension and more detailed specification of the traditional databank format. A conforming reader and writer is provided by EconPy.
