= StatPlus =

Software product developed by AnalystSoft

StatPlus is a software product developed by AnalystSoft for basic univariate and multivariate statistical analysis (MANOVA, GLM, Latin squares), as well as time series analysis, nonparametric statistics, survival analysis and statistical charts including control charts. It was originally developed for use in biomedical sciences and known as BioStat. It is nowadays mostly used in biomedicine and natural sciences.

The software has a version for the Mac OS X known as StatPlus:mac. This version may also be used as an add-on (software) to Microsoft Excel, similar to Microsoft's Analysis Toolpak on Windows.
