= TSP (econometrics software) =

TSP (Time Series Processor)
- Developer: TSP International
- Stable release: 5.1 / September 2009
- Operating system: Windows; Mac OS X Linux
- Type: Programming language Econometric software
- License: Proprietary
- Website: www.tspintl.com

TSP is a programming language for the estimation and simulation of econometric models. TSP stands for "Time Series Processor", although it is also commonly used with cross section and panel data. The program was initially developed by Robert Hall during his graduate studies at Massachusetts Institute of Technology in the 1960s. The company behind the program is TSP International which was founded in 1978 by Bronwyn H. Hall, Robert Hall's wife. After their divorce in April 1983, the asset of TSP was split into two versions, and subsequently the two versions have diverged in terms of interface and types of subroutines included. One version is TSP, still developed by TSP International. The other version, initially named MicroTSP, is now named EViews, developed by Quantitative Micro Software.

== Supported data formats ==
- Microsoft Excel file format
- Stata dta files up to version 11
- Databank format (.DB)
