= Statistics Online Computational Resource =

US research organization

Statistics Online Computational Resource (SOCR)
- Founded: January 5, 2002
- Type: not-for-profit
- Purpose: scientific computing, data analytics, visualization, inference, education
- Coordinates: 42.284199°N 83.738072°W
- Website: www.socr.umich.edu

The Statistics Online Computational Resource (SOCR) is an online multi-institutional research and education organization. SOCR designs, validates and broadly shares a suite of online tools for statistical computing, and interactive materials for hands-on learning and teaching concepts in data science, statistical analysis and probability theory. The SOCR resources are platform agnostic based on HTML, XML and Java, and all materials, tools and services are freely available over the Internet.

The core SOCR components include interactive distribution calculators, statistical analysis modules, tools for data modeling, graphics visualization, instructional resources, learning activities and other resources.

All SOCR resources are licensed under either the GNU Lesser General Public License or CC BY; peer-reviewed, integrated internally and interoperate with independent digital libraries developed by other professional societies and scientific organizations like NSDL, Open Educational Resources, Mathematical Association of America, California Digital Library, LONI Pipeline, etc.

== See also ==
- List of statistical packages
- Comparison of statistical packages
