= Dataplot =

Scientific visualization software

- Developer: National Institute of Standards and Technology
- Initial release: 1978
- Stable release: 2021_06_08
- Written in: Fortran
- Operating system: Unix/Linux, Mac OS X, Microsoft Windows
- Type: Scientific visualization
- Website: www.nist.gov/itl/sed/dataplot

Dataplot is a public domain software system for scientific visualization and statistical analysis. It was developed and is being maintained at the National Institute of Standards and Technology. Dataplot's source code is available and in public domain.
