= Salstat =

- Developers: Alan J. Salmoni and Mark Livingstone
- Stable release: 20140516 / May 16, 2014; 11 years ago
- Written in: Python
- Operating system: Cross-platform
- Type: Statistics
- License: GNU General Public License
- Website: github.com/salmoni/Salstat

Salstat is a free software application for the statistical analysis of numeric data with an emphasis on ease-of-use. Using both a graphical user interface and command line interface, it can perform all sorts of analyses including descriptive statistics and a range of inferential tests (both parametric and nonparametric). It is written in the Python language and works on any platform that supports Python, NumPy, SciPy, and wxPython. In June 2012, it had received at least 38,000 downloads from its Sourceforge site and spawned a 'son-of' program called Salstat Statistics Package 2. Some of the code was adopted by the PCMDI program for climate analysis and CDAT, both linked to Lawrence Livermore National Laboratories.

== Current status ==
The most recent release was in 2003 but it is being updated by Mark Livingstone.
