= NLOGIT =

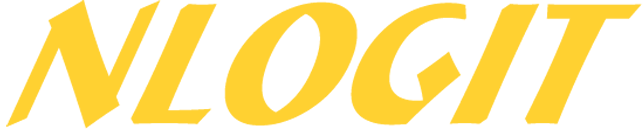

- NLOGIT on Microsoft Windows
- Original author(s): William H. Greene
- Developer(s): Econometric Software, Inc. (until 2024)
- Final release: 6 / 7 September 2016
- Operating system: Windows
- Type: statistical analysis • econometric analysis
- License: Proprietary
- Website: www.nlogit.com

NLOGIT is a stand-alone extension of the econometric software package LIMDEP. It adds estimation, simulation and diagnostic tools for multinomial discrete-choice models—ranging from basic multinomial logit to mixed logit, random-regret logit, nested logit and latent-class specifications.

Although first targeted at economists, NLOGIT is now cited in studies across the social sciences, public health, transportation and marketing. Recent applied work still relies on version 6, released in 2016, because no further updates have appeared since the developer announced its closure in 2024.

== History ==
Econometric Software, Inc. was founded in the early 1980s by NYU economist William H. Greene. An experimental “DISCRETE CHOICE” command in LIMDEP 6.0 (1994) evolved into a separate product: NLOGIT 1.0 (1996), whose core feature was a full‐information nested-logit estimator. Over the next two decades the program grew into a superset of LIMDEP, adding multinomial probit, mixed logit and a graphical simulation interface.

On 1 November 2024 an official notice on the company’s website (mirrored by regional reseller SoftHome International) stated: “After 35 years of developing and providing pioneering tools for micro-econometric analysis, Econometric Software, Inc. is closing its operations. We wholeheartedly thank all our users …”. Since that announcement the main domains limdep.com and nlogit.com have gone offline, and version 6 (build 10.0.12) remains the final release.

== Models ==
NLOGIT implements full-information maximum-likelihood or simulated-likelihood estimators for a wide range of choice models. Among them are:

- Unrestricted and scaled multinomial logit models, including heteroscedastic variants.
- Mixed logit (a.k.a. random-parameters logit) with flexible distributional assumptions.
- Random-regret logit and “willingness-to-pay-space’’ parameterisations.
- Nested logit, heteroscedastic extreme value and error-components logit.
- Multinomial probit with simulation-based integration.
- Latent class models for unobserved taste heterogeneity.

== Data analysis and simulation ==
A project interface lets users combine data management, model estimation and “what-if’’ market-share simulations in one session. Probability forecasts from the fitted model can be recomputed under counter-factual scenarios—such as price changes or policy interventions—either for the original sample or for any compatible external dataset.

== Current status ==
Since the 2024 closure of Econometric Software, NLOGIT is no longer sold or supported, and the official download servers are offline. Existing licence holders can still run version 6 on modern Windows systems, but new users typically adopt open-source alternatives (e.g. Python Biogeme or R gmnl) that replicate most NLOGIT functionality.

== See also ==
- List of statistical packages
- Comparison of statistical packages
- LIMDEP
