= S-PLUS =

Implementation of the S programming language

- Developer: TIBCO Software Inc.
- Stable release: 8.2 / November 2010; 15 years ago
- Operating system: Windows, Unix/Linux
- Type: Statistical package
- License: Proprietary

S-PLUS was a commercial implementation of the S programming language sold by TIBCO Software Inc.

It features object-oriented programming capabilities and advanced analytical algorithms. Its statistical analysis capabilities are commonly used by econometricians. The S-PLUS FinMetrics software package was developed for econometric time series analysis.

Due to the increasing popularity of the open source S successor R, TIBCO Software released the TIBCO Enterprise Runtime for R (TERR) as an alternative R interpreter. It is available on Windows and UNIX operating systems.

== Historical timeline ==
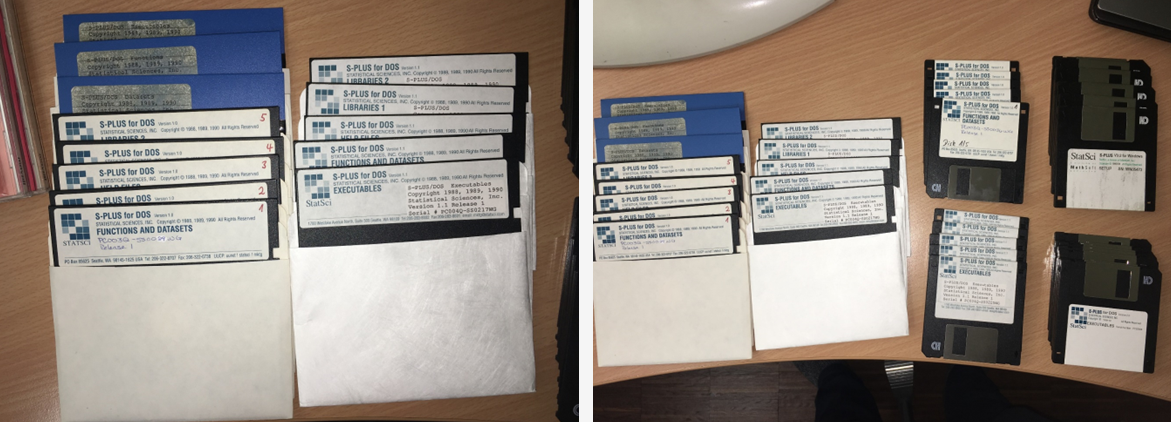
S-PLUS floppy disk installation media

In 1988, S-PLUS was first developed and released by a Seattle-based start-up company called Statistical Sciences, Inc. The company's founder and sole owner was R. Douglas Martin, professor of statistics at the University of Washington, Seattle. Martin originally learned S while working at Bell Laboratories, where the S language was originally developed. At the time of its release, S-PLUS was one of the first examples of software that implemented algorithms for generalized linear models, second to GLIM.

Statistical Sciences acquired the exclusive license to distribute S and merged with MathSoft in 1993, becoming the firm's Data Analysis Products Division (DAPD).

In 1995, S-PLUS 3.3 for Windows 95/NT was released, including the Matrix library, command history capability, and Trellis graphics. This was followed by the release of S-PLUS 3.4 for UNIX in 1996. This version included a non-linear mixed-effects modeling library, hexagonal binning, and cluster methods. S-PLUS 4 was released for Windows in 1997, with features such as an updated GUI, integration with Excel, and editable graphics. S-PLUS 4.5 for Windows in 1998, with Scatterplot brushing, and the ability to create S-PLUS graphs from within Excel & SPSS. The software also became available for Linux & Solaris.

In 1999, S-PLUS 5 was released for Solaris, Linux, HP-UX, AIX, IRIX, and DEC Alpha. S-PLUS 2000 for Windows. nlme 3.3, quality control charting, and new commands for data manipulation. This was followed by S-PLUS 6 for Linux/Unix in 2000. This version had a Java-based GUI, Graphlets, survival5, and a library for handling missing data.

In 2001, MathSoft sold its Cambridge-based Engineering and Education Products Division (EEPD), was renamed Insightful Corporation, and moved headquarters to Seattle. This essentially reversed the previous merger between MathSoft and Statistical Sciences, Inc. S-PLUS Analytic Server 2.0. S-PLUS 6 was released for Windows in 2001.

In 2002, StatServer 6 was released and the student edition of S-PLUS became free. S-PLUS 6.2 was released and ported to AIX. In 2004, Insightful purchased the S language from Lucent Technologies for $2 million, and released S+ArrayAnalyzer 2.0.

S-PLUS 7.0 was released in 2005, including the BigData library for working with larger-than-memory data sets and the S-PLUS Workbench (Eclipse development tool). Insightful Miner 7.0 was also released. In 2007, S-PLUS 8 was released with a new package system, language extensions for R package compatibility, and a workbench debugger.

TIBCO acquired Insightful Corporation for $25 million in 2008.

On 31st January 2026, TIBCO officially retired the product.

== See also ==
- R programming language
