= GraphPad Software =

American Software development company

- Industry: Software development
- Founded: 1989
- Founder: Harvey Motulsky
- Fate: Acquired by Insight Partners

GraphPad Software Inc. was a privately held software development corporation until its acquisition by Insight Partners in 2017. The company was named Insightful Science and merged with Dotmatics in 2021.

== Overview ==
The original software was written by Harvey Motulsky in 1989 and the company was co-founded by Motulsky and Earl Beutler. The company operates in California and its products include the 2D scientific graphing, biostatistics, curve fitting software GraphPad Prism and the free, web-based statistical calculation software, GraphPad QuickCalcs.

The company was acquired in 2017 by Insight Partners and then later merged with Dotmatics in 2021.

== GraphPad Prism ==
GraphPad Prism
- Developers: GraphPad Software, Inc.
- Stable release: 10.3.0
- Operating system: macOS and Windows
- Type: Scientific graphing, statistics and nonlinear regression (curve fitting)
- License: Commercial proprietary software
- Website: www.graphpad.com

GraphPad Prism is a commercial scientific 2D graphing and statistics software for Windows and Mac OS desktop computers. Software features include nonlinear regression, with functionalities including the removal of outliers, comparisons of models, comparisons of curves, and interpolation of standard curves. The software allows the automatic updating of results and graphs, and has functionality for displaying error bars. Features for usability include built in formulae, batch processing and standardisation features, along with automated analysis and data validation.
