= Winpepi =

Freeware package of statistical programs for epidemiologists

WinPepi is a freeware package of statistical programs for epidemiologists, comprising seven programs with over 120 modules. WinPepi is not a complete compendium of statistical routines for epidemiologists but it provides a very wide range of procedures, including those most commonly used and many that are not easy to find elsewhere. This has repeatedly led reviewers to use a "Swiss army knife" analogy. Each program has a comprehensive fully referenced manual.

WinPepi had its origins in 1983 in a book of programs for hand-held calculators. In 1993, this was developed into a set of DOS-based computer programs by Paul M. Gahlinger with the assistance of one of the original authors of calculator programs, Prof. JH Abramson that came to be called Pepi (an acronym for "Programs for EPIdemiologists") and evolved, after its fourth version in 2001, into WinPepi (Pepi-for-Windows). New expanded versions were issued at frequent intervals. Professor Joe Abramson died away on February 17, 2017, and since then no longer is developed. The latest update (version 11.65) was released on August 23, 2016.

The programs are notable for their user-friendliness. A portal links to programs and manuals. Menus, buttons, on-screen instructions, help screens, pop-up hints, and built-in error traps are also provided. The programs can also be operated from a USB flash drive.

WinPepi does not provide data management facilities. With some exceptions, it requires the entry (at the keyboard or by pasting from a spreadsheet or text file) of data that have already been counted or summarized.
