= GAUSS (software) =

Matrix programming language

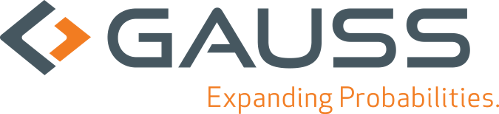
- Developer: Aptech Systems
- Initial release: 1984; 42 years ago
- Stable release: 22.1.0 / 10 March 2022; 4 years ago
- Operating system: Linux, macOS, Windows
- Type: programming language
- License: proprietary
- Website: www.aptech.com

GAUSS is a matrix programming language for mathematics and statistics, developed and marketed by Aptech Systems. Its primary purpose is the solution of numerical problems in statistics, econometrics, time-series, optimization and 2D- and 3D-visualization. It was first written in 1980 and was first published in 1984 for MS-DOS. It has since become available for Linux, macOS and Windows.

== Examples ==
- GAUSS has several application modules as well as functions in its runtime library (i.e., functions that come with GAUSS without extra cost):
  - Qprog – Quadratic programming
  - SqpSolvemt – Sequential quadratic programming
  - QNewton - Quasi-Newton unconstrained optimization
  - EQsolve - Nonlinear equations solver

== GAUSS Applications ==
A range of toolboxes are available for GAUSS at additional cost.

Toolboxes
Toolbox	Description
Algorithmic Derivatives	A program for generating GAUSS procedures for computing algorithmic derivatives.
Constrained Maximum Likelihood MT	Solves the general maximum likelihood problem subject to general constraints on the parameters.
Constrained Optimization	Solves the nonlinear programming problem subject to general constraints on the parameters.
CurveFit	Nonlinear curve fitting.
Descriptive Statistics	Basic sample statistics including means, frequencies and crosstabs. This application is backwards compatible with programs written with Descriptive Statistics 3.1.
Descriptive Statistics MT	Basic sample statistics including means, frequencies and crosstabs. This application is thread-safe and takes advantage of structures.
Discrete Choice	A statistical package for estimating discrete choice and other models in which the dependent variable is qualitative in some way.
FANPAC MT	Comprehensive suite of GARCH (Generalized AutoRegressive Conditional Heteroskedastic) models for estimating volatility.
Linear Programming MT	Solves small and large scale linear programming problems.
Linear Regression MT	Least squares estimation.
Loglinear Analysis MT	Analysis of categorical data using log-linear analysis.
Maximum Likelihood MT	Maximum likelihood estimation of the parameters of statistical models.
Nonlinear Equations MT	Solves systems of nonlinear equations having as many equations as unknowns.
Optimization	Unconstrained optimization.
Time Series MT	Exact ML estimation of VARMAX, VARMA, ARIMAX, ARIMA, and ECM models subject to general constraints on the parameters. Panel data estimation. Cointegration and unit root tests.

== See also ==
- List of numerical-analysis software
