= PSPP =

Data analysis software

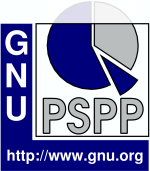
- PSPP logo

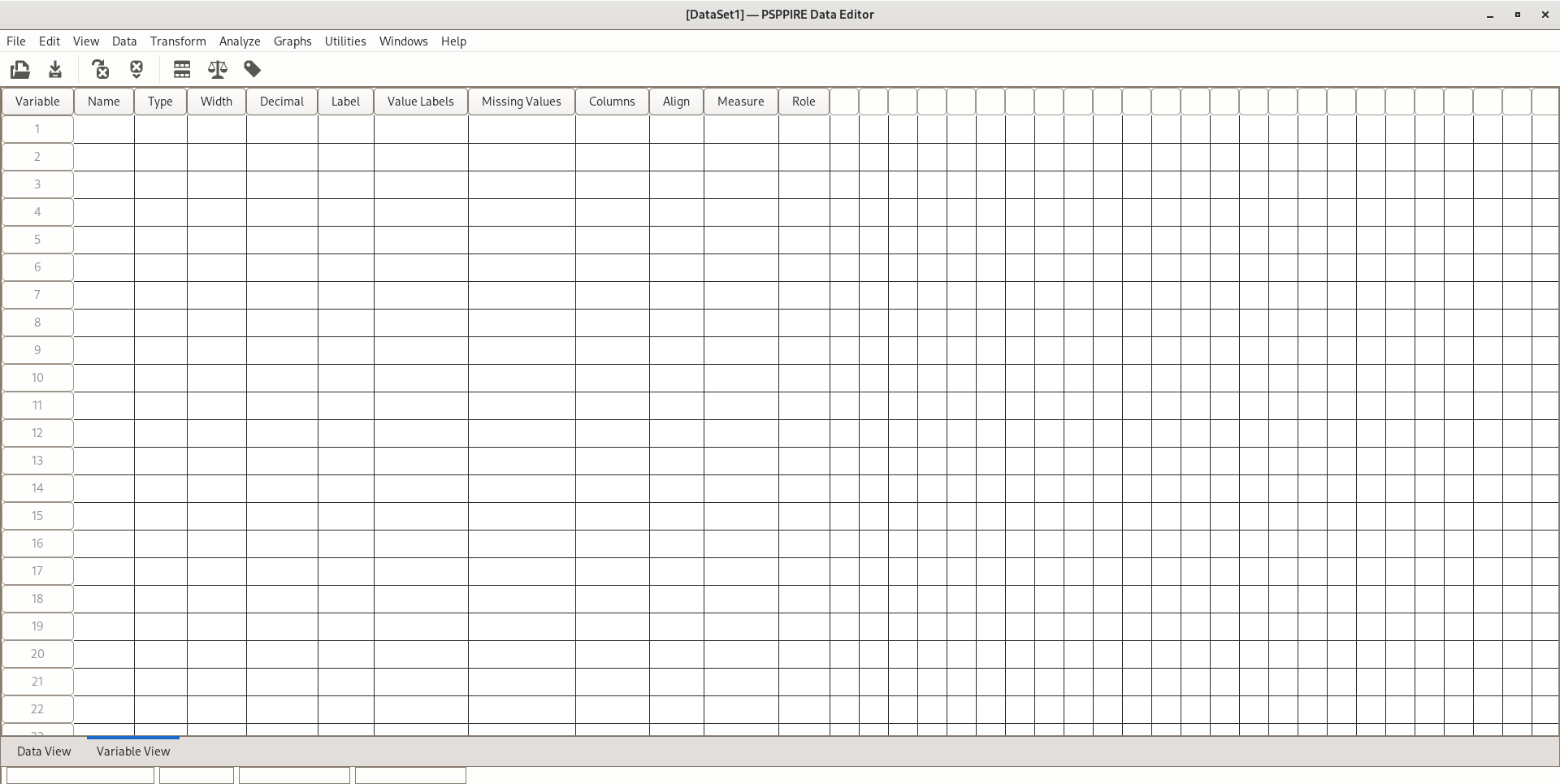
- Screenshot of PSPP
- Developer: GNU Project
- Stable release: 2.1.2 / 19 September 2026; 17 days ago
- Written in: C
- Operating system: GNU, macOS, Microsoft Windows, Linux
- Type: Statistics
- License: GNU General Public License
- Website: www.gnu.org/software/pspp/
- Repository: git.savannah.gnu.org/cgit/pspp.git

PSPP is a free software application for analysis of sampled data, intended as a free alternative for IBM SPSS Statistics. It has a graphical user interface and conventional command-line interface. It is written in C and uses GNU Scientific Library for its mathematical routines. The name has "no official acronymic expansion".

== Features ==
This software provides a comprehensive set of capabilities including frequencies, cross-tabs comparison of means (t-tests and one-way ANOVA), linear regression, logistic regression, reliability (Cronbach's alpha, not failure or Weibull), and re-ordering data, non-parametric tests, factor analysis, cluster analysis, principal components analysis, chi-square analysis and more.

At the user's choice, statistical output and graphics are available in ASCII, PDF, PostScript, SVG or HTML formats. A range of statistical graphs can be produced, such as histograms, pie-charts, scree plots, and np-charts.

PSPP can import Gnumeric and OpenDocument spreadsheets, Postgres databases, comma-separated values and ASCII files. It can export files in the SPSS 'portable' and 'system' file formats and to ASCII files. Some of the libraries used by PSPP can be accessed programmatically; PSPP-Perl provides an interface to the libraries used by PSPP.

=== Origins ===
The PSPP project (originally called "Fiasco") was born at the end of the 1990s as a free software replacement for SPSS, which is a data management and analysis tool, at the time produced by SPSS Inc. The nature of SPSS's proprietary licensing and the presence of digital restrictions management motivated the author to write an alternative which later became functionally identical, but with permission for everyone to copy, modify and share.

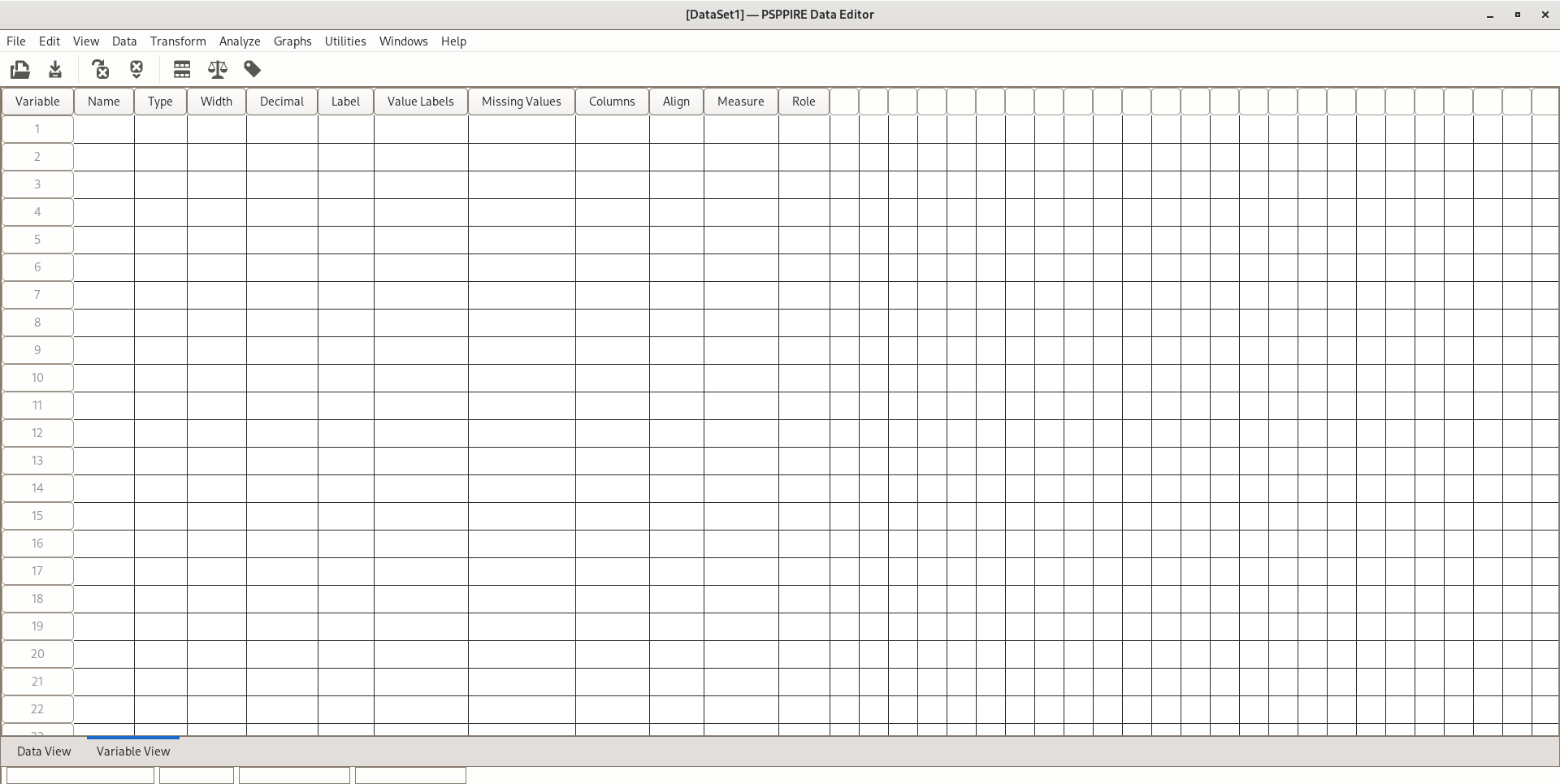
PSPP 1.6.2

== Third Party Reviews ==
In the book "SPSS For Dummies", the author discusses PSPP under the heading of "Ten Useful Things You Can Find on the Internet". Another review of free to use statistical software also finds that the statistical results from PSPP match statistical results for SAS, for frequencies, means, correlation and regression.

== Research about PSPP ==
One study found that students who used PSPP became more positive about learning statistics while using PSPP.

== Examples of Research Performed using PSPP ==
Among the studies done using PSPP are one about posttraumatic stress in adolescents, another about nutrition software, and another about internet addiction.

== See also ==
- Comparison of statistical packages

== External Resources ==
- PSPP for Beginners
