= List of information graphics software =

This is a list of notable software to create any kind of information graphics:

- either includes the ability to create one or more infographics from a provided data set
- either it is provided specifically for information visualization

Software	Example(s)	Interface	License(s)		Initial release year	Latest release	Operating system	Distinguishing features
Software	Example(s)	Interface	License	Open source (yes/no)	Initial release year	Latest release	Operating system	Distinguishing features
Kst		GUI, CLI	GPL	Yes	2004	2021, v 2.0.x	Linux, macOS, Windows	Fast real-time large-dataset plotting and viewing tool with basic data analysis functions
AIDA			LGPL	Yes	2001	October 2003 / 3.2.1		Open interfaces and formats for particle physics data processing
Algebrator		GUI	Proprietary	No	1999	2009 / 4.2	Linux, macOS, Sugar, Windows	2D graphs
Baudline	Baudline	GUI	Proprietary	No	2000	July 21, 2010 / 1.08	FreeBSD, Linux, macOS, Solaris	Signal analysis tool
D3js		JavaScript library	BSD	Yes	2011	August 25, 2018 / 5.7.0	web browsers, js engines	static and dynamic presentations
DADiSP	DADiSP	GUI, command line, SPL script language	Proprietary	No	1987	January 17, 2017 / 6.7 B02	Windows	Numerical analysis and signal processing with a spreadsheet-like interface
DAP			GNU-style copyleft	Yes	1998	April 16, 2014 / 3.10		Statistics
DataGraph		GUI, command line	Proprietary	No	2006	February 17, 2020 / 4.5.1	macOS	2D graphing, animations, data analysis, linear and non-linear curve fitting
DataScene		GUI	Shareware	No	2009	March 2011 / 3.0.7	Linux, Unix/X11, Windows	2D & 3D graphing, animated graphs, data analysis, curve fitting, and data monitoring
EditGrid		GUI (web based)		No	2006		Any (Web-based application)	Online spreadsheet; service to end May 1, 2014
EJS	EJS	GUI	GPL	Yes	2014		Linux, macOS, Windows	Creates ODE solving interactive, ready-to-publish Java applets
Epi Info			GPL	Yes	1985	February 2, 2018 / 7.2.2.6	Windows	Statistics
EViews			Proprietary	No	1994	June 21, 2017 / 10		Statistics
Fityk	old screenshot	GUI, command line	GPL	Yes	2004	December 19, 2016 / 1.3.1	Linux, macOS, Windows	specialized in curve fitting
FlexPro			Proprietary	No	1991	2017	MS Windows only	
FreeMat	Freemat screenshot		GPL	Yes	2004	June 30, 2013 / 4.2	Linux, macOS, Windows	
FusionCharts	FusionCharts	GUI (web based), JavaScript Charting Library	Proprietary	No	2002	November 1, 2016 / 3.11.3	All Web Browsers (including IE 6), JS Engines	Interactive JavaScript Charts
GeoGebra	GeoGebra	GUI	GPL with non-commercial restriction	Yes	2001	September 3, 2017 / 6.0.385.0	Linux, macOS, Sugar, Windows, Android	rendering of geometry, graphs, statistical diagrams, (LaTeX) formula rendering; antialiasing in PNG Export; exports to SVG, EPS, EMF, PNG, PDF
Gephi	Gephi	GUI	GPLv3 / CDDL 1.0	Yes	2008	February 14, 2016 / 0.9.1	Linux, macOS, Windows	Networks and complex systems, dynamic and hierarchical graphs
ggplot2		R	GPL2	Yes	2007	December 30, 2016 / 2.2.1	Cross-platform	Based on The Grammar of Graphics
Grafana	Grafana	GUI (web based)	GNU Affero General Public License v3.0	Yes	2014	May 22, 2025 / 12.0.1	All Web Browsers	Diagrams, Live Data Analysis, Public Dashboards
Graphs	A screenshot of the software applciation Graphs, showing imported data with error bars.	GUI	GPL	Yes	2022	October 26, 2026 / 2.0.8	Linux	Graphical plotting within GNOME Circle, plots data from imported files, or generated by equation. Supports analytical mathematics on equations.
Gnumeric		GUI	GPL	Yes	2001	August 19, 2018 / 1.12.43	Cross-platform	Spreadsheet
GNU Octave	Octave	GUI, command line, C, C++, Fortran	GPL	Yes	1993	April 13, 2023 / 8.2.0	FreeBSD, Linux, macOS, OS/2 (including eComStation and ArcaOS), Solaris, Windows, Android	MATLAB compatible, built-in ODE and DAE solvers, extensive user contributed toolboxes
Gnuplot	Foucault pendulum	Command line, Python, Ruby, Smalltalk, third-party GUIs	Own license	Yes	1986	June 1, 2023 / 5.4.8	Amiga, Atari ST, BeOS, Linux, Mac, DOS, OS/2 (including eComStation and ArcaOS), OS-9/68k, Ultrix, Windows, VMS, Android	Built in scripting language
GrADS		command line	GPL	Yes	1988	April 25, 2018 / 2.2.1	Linux, macOS, Windows, Solaris, IBM AIX, DEC Alpha, IRIX	Visualization of Earth science data
GraphPad Prism		GUI	proprietary	No	1989	October 12, 2016 / 7.0b	Mac, Windows	
Grace	Grace-screenshot	Command line, GUI, various APIs	GPL	Yes	1998	February 14, 2015 / 5.1.25	Linux, Mac(X11), Windows (cygwin)	Uses Motif; fork of Xmgr
Graphviz		DOT language	CPL	Yes	1991	December 25, 2016 / 2.40.1	Linux, macOS, Windows	
gretl		GUI	GPL	Yes	2000	September 3, 2018 / 2018c	Linux, Mac, Windows	Specialized in econometrics and time series analyses, built-in scripting language, interface to gnuplot and R
HippoDraw			GPL v2	Yes	1992	October 2007 / 1.21.3		C++-based data analysis system
IGOR Pro	IGOR Pro	GUI	proprietary	No	1989	April 11, 2019 / 8.0.3	Mac, Windows	3D and volume visualization, Curve and peak fitting, Signal processing, Image processing
ILNumerics		Math library for .NET, C#	GPL / proprietary	No	2006	June 11, 2015 / v4.8	Windows and Linux	Math library with rich visualization features (interactive 3D scenes, scientific plotting) and MATLAB-like syntax
JFreeChart	JFreeChart screenshot	GUI, Java, Groovy	LGPL	Yes	2000	November 5, 2017 / 1.5.0	Any (Java)	
JMP	Sample of six JMP graphs	GUI, scripting	proprietary	No	1989	March 9, 2021 / 16.0	Mac, Windows	Interactive statistical graphics
Calligra Sheets	KChart	GUI	GPL	Yes	2010	March 21, 2017 / 3.0.1	Linux (KDE)	The charting tool of Calligra Suite, an integrated graphic art and office suite developed by KDE
Kig		GUI	GPL	Yes	2006			Geometry diagrams only
LabPlot	LabPlot screenshot	GUI, Qt, C, C++	GNU GPLv2 or later	Yes	2001	July 16, 2024 / 2.11.1	Microsoft Windows, macOS, Linux, FreeBSD, Haiku	2D plotting, suitable for creation of publication-ready plots
LabVIEW			Proprietary	No	1986	May 2017 / 2017		Visual circuits modeling
LibreOffice		GUI	MPL-2.0	Yes	2011	September 8, 2022 / 7.3.6	Linux, macOS, Windows	Spreadsheet, Diagrams, Statistical Functions
LiSiCA	LiSiCA	Python		No	2015		Windows, Linux	Ligand-based virtual screening software that searches for 2D and 3D similarities between a reference compound and a database of target compounds
MagicPlot		GUI	Proprietary	No	2008	January 18, 2021 / 3.0	Any (Java)	Nonlinear fitting, batch processing
Maple	Maple	GUI, command line	Proprietary	No	1982	May 25, 2017 / 2017	Linux, macOS, Windows	
MathCad		GUI	Proprietary	No	1986	March 6, 2017 / Prime 4.0, November 2015 / 15.0 M045	Windows	Simple GUI driven interface
Mathematica		GUI, command line, C++	Proprietary	No	1988	15.0.1 (July 2026; 3 months ago) [±]	Linux, macOS, Windows, Raspberry Pi	Computer algebra, statistics and numerical analysis system with general graphic language; see Wolfram Language
MATLAB	MATLAB	GUI	Proprietary	No	1979	September 20, 2017 / R2017b	Linux, macOS, Windows	Matrix system
Maxima		GUI, command line	GPL	Yes	1982	October 3, 2017 / 5.41.0	BSD, Linux, macOS, Unix, Windows, Android	Various graphical user interfaces, Support LaTeX with GNU TeXmacs and Web frontend with SageMath
MayaVi	Mayavi	GUI, Python, scriptable, embeddable	BSD	Yes	2019	August 3, 2018 / 4.6.2	Linux, macOS, Windows	Visualises computational grids, scalar/vector/tensor data; texture & ray-cast mappers
MedCalc		GUI	Proprietary	No	1993	August 17, 2017 / 17.9	Windows	Statistics
Microsoft Excel		GUI	Proprietary	No	1987		macOS, Windows	Spreadsheet
NCSS		GUI	Proprietary	No	1981	May 2, 2016 / NCSS 11	Windows	Statistical analysis and graphics software
Nucalc		GUI	proprietary	No	1994		Mac OS, macOS, Windows	
Numbers (iWork)		GUI	Proprietary	No	2007	March 28, 2017 / 4.1	macOS	Spreadsheet
OpenDX		GUI	Proprietary	No	1991	January 19, 2006 / 4.4.0	Cross-platform	
OpenOffice.org Calc		GUI	GNU LGPL	Yes	2002	January 25, 2011 / 3.3	Cross-platform	Spreadsheet
OpenPlaG	openPlaG	GUI	GPL	Yes	2007	June 12, 2018 / 3.5	Any (PHP 5)	graph plotter to use on websites
Orange	Orange	GUI, Python scripting	GPL	Yes	1996	September 3, 2017 / 3.5	Linux, Windows, macOS	A visual programming data-flow software suite with widgets for statistical data analysis, interactive data visualization, data mining, and machine learning
Origin		GUI, COM, C/C++ and scripting	proprietary	No	1992	June 22, 2017 / 2017 SR2	Windows	Multi-layer 2D, 3D, and statistical graphs for science and engineering; built-in digitizing tool; auto-recalculation and reporting; programmable, with access to NAG Numerical Library
ParaView		GUI, Python scripting	GPL	Yes	2002	June 19, 2018 / 5.5.2	Linux/Unix, macOS, Windows	Parallel scientific and computational fluid dynamics visualizations
Perl Data Language (PDL)	PDL		Artistic License / GPL	Yes	1996	May 6, 2018 / 2.019	Perl Data Language	
PGPLOT		FORTRAN, C		No	1983	February 26, 2001 / 5.2.2	Linux, Mac, Windows	(Fortran) California Institute of Technology, Inactive as of 2001
ploticus	A plot of Wikipedia statistics in Ploticus	Command line, C	GPL	Yes	1999	May 2013 / 2.42	Linux, Mac, Windows	plots and charts from data
Plotly	A plot made using plotly	GUI, command line Python	Commercial	No	2012		Any (web-based)	plots and charts in browser, web-sharing and exporting, drag-and-drop data import, Python command line
plotutils		command line, C/C++	GPL	Yes	1989	September 27, 2009 / 2.6	Linux, Mac, Windows	Collection of command line programs, C/C++ API
PLplot	3D surface plot	Ada, C/C++/D, Fortran 77/90, C, C++, Java, Lisp, Lua, OCaml, Octave, Perl, Python, Tcl/Tk	LGPL	Yes	2001	August 26, 2017 / 5.13.0	Linux, Mac, Windows	Many different output formats: CGM, GIF, Jpeg, Png, Latex, PBM, PDF, Postscript, SVG, XFig, Qt, wxWidgets
PSPP		GUI, command line	GPL	Yes	1997	August 20, 2017 / 1.0.0	Linux, Mac, Windows	Statistical analysis of sampled data; free replacement for SPSS
QtiPlot		GUI, Python	proprietary	No	2004	May 31, 2017 / 0.9.9.11	Linux, Mac, Windows	Python scriptable
R		Third party	GPL	Yes	1993	July 2, 2018 / 3.5.1("Feather Spray")	Linux, Mac, Windows	In addition to base graphics, has a large number of graphics packages including lattice and ggplot2. Interoperabile with other free software packages
ROOT	ROOT plot showing regions of interest in a 2D distribution	GUI, C++, Python, Ruby	LGPL	Yes	1994	August 23, 2018 / 6.14.04	Linux, Mac, Windows	De facto standard in high energy physics
RRDtool	RRDtool	Command line	GPL	Yes	1999	May 17, 2017 / 1.7.0	Linux, Windows	
S-PLUS			Proprietary	No	1988	November 2010 / 8.2		Statistics
S				?	1976			Statistics
SAS			Proprietary	No	1972	July 10, 2013 / 9.4		Statistics
Scilab	Scilab		CeCILL	Yes	1990	February 14, 2019 / 6.0.2	Linux, macOS, Windows	Matrix system
SciPy, NumPy, matplotlib modules for Python	matplotlib	Python, GUI, command line	BSD/matplotlib	Yes	2003	June 21, 2017 / 0.19.1, July 6, 2017 / 1.13.1, May 10, 2017 / 2.0.2	FreeBSD, Linux, macOS, Windows	Extensive numerical and scientific library with MATLAB-style plotting
SOCR				Yes	2002			Online tool suite for statistical computing
Sonic Visualiser		GUI	GPL	Yes	2010	August 14, 2018 / 3.1.1	Linux, macOS, Windows	
SPSS		GUI, command line	Proprietary	No	1968	August 8, 2017 / 25.0		Statistics
Stata			Proprietary	No	1985	June 6, 2017 / 15.0		Statistics
Statgraphics	Statgraphics	GUI	Proprietary	No	1980	July 2015 / 17.1.08	Windows	Statistical package for exploratory data analysis, dynamic data visualization, statistical modeling, design of experiments, time series forecasting, quality improvement, Six Sigma
Statistical Lab				Yes	2005	May 2, 2011 / 3.81		
Systat			Proprietary	No	1979			Statistics
SymPy	SymPy		BSD	Yes	2007	September 14, 2018 / 1.3	Linux, macOS, Windows	Python library for computer algebra and symbolic mathematics
Sysquake		GUI, command line	Proprietary	No	2001	November 5, 2013 / 5.0	Linux, macOS, Windows	MATLAB compatible, interactive graphics
SciDAVis		GUI, Python	GPL	Yes	2007	June 4, 2018 / 1.23	Linux, Mac, Windows	Qt4-based GUI, Python scriptable
SigmaPlot		GUI	proprietary	No	1983	2014 / 13.0.0	Windows	
TAChart		Charting library	modified LGPL	Yes	2012	November 13, 2016 / 1.6.2	Linux, macOS, Windows	Very flexible charting component for Lazarus / Free Pascal
Tableau		GUI	Proprietary	No	2003		Windows	Spreadsheet
Tecplot		GUI	proprietary	No	1988	2016 / 2016	Linux, Mac, Unix, Windows	Computational fluid dynamics
Teechart		Charting library	Open source	Yes	1995	April 26, 2021	Windows, macOS, Linux, iOS, Android	Full set of chart types, maps & gauges, interactive, real-time, PNG, JPEG export, cross-browser support, integration with WordPress, Drupal, Node.js, Joomla, TypeScript, NuGet among others
think-cell chart		GUI	proprietary	No	2002		Windows	Support for waterfall, Marimekko and Gantt charts; direct integration into Microsoft PowerPoint
Veusz		GUI, Python, command line	GPL	Yes	2007	October 11, 2025 / 4.2	Windows	Create publication-quality PS/PDF plots, Python scripting and plugin interface
Visifire		Independent of server side scripting	Proprietary	No	2008	June 5, 2014 / 5.1.7-0	Mac, Windows	
VisIt		GUI, C++, Python, and Java	BSD	Yes	2002	May 2018 / 2.13.2	Linux, Mac, Windows	Designed to handle very large data sets
Webix		JavaScript library	GPLV3/Proprietary	Yes	2013	June 27, 2017 / 4.4	Cross platforms, cross browsers	JavaScript/HTML5 based; more than 75 widgets and controls; maps; charts; data tables; organograms; gauge charts
Winplot		GUI	Freeware	No	1985		Microsoft Windows	
World Programming System (WPS Analytics)		GUI, command line	Proprietary	No	2002	March 2020 / v4.2	AIX, Linux, Linux for Arm8 64-bit (AArch64), macOS, PowerLinux, POWER/System p/pSeries (LE), Windows, Linux for System z, z/OS	Statistics; handles very large data sets; supports mixing Python, R, SAS, and SQL languages in one user program
Xgraph		GUI, command line	Proprietary	No	1985	July 2018 / v4.38	Linux, Windows, Mac, FreeBSD, Solaris	Interactive and batch 2D data file plotting
Zoho Office Suite		GUI (web based)	Proprietary	No	2005		Any (web-based application)	Online spreadsheet

== Vector graphics ==
Vector graphics software can be used for manual graphing or for editing the output of another program; see:

- Category:Vector graphics editors
- Comparison of vector graphics editors

Some online editors using vector graphics for specific needs exist. These creative interfaces work well together with data visualization tools like the ones above.

== See also ==
- Category:Diagramming software
- List of graphical methods
- PGF/TikZ – Graphics languages
