= List of statistical software =

The following is a list of statistical software.

== Open-source ==
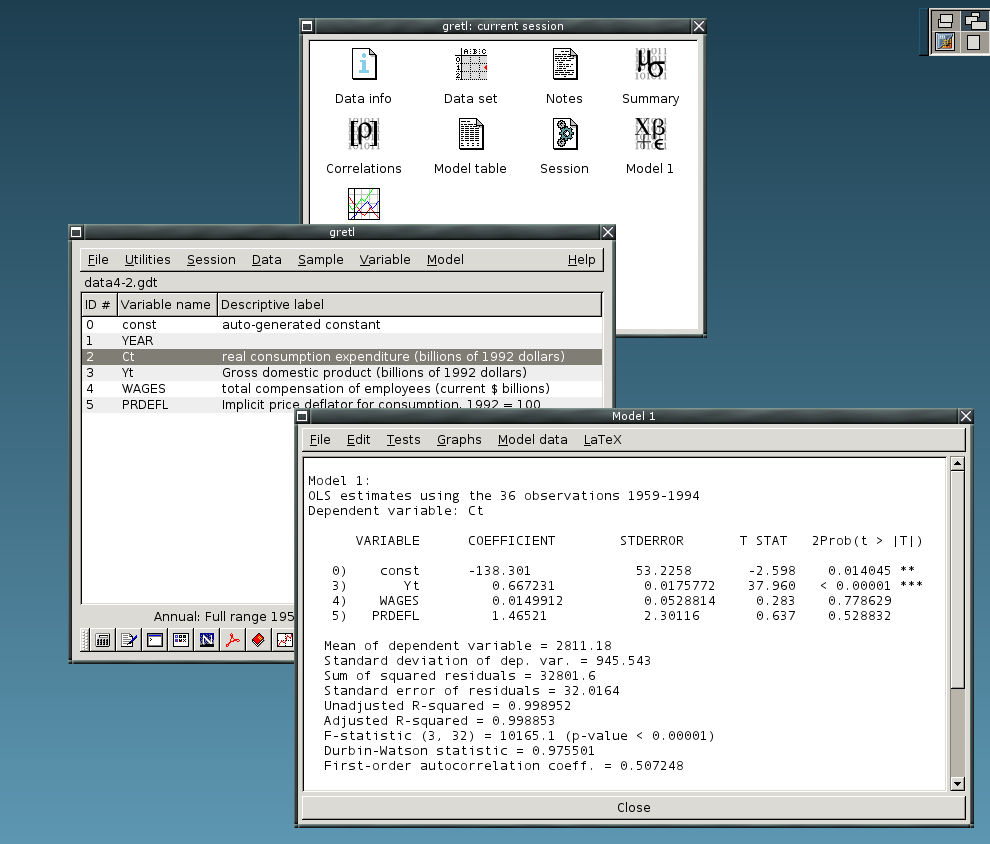
gretl is an example of an open-source statistical package

- ADaMSoft – a generalized statistical software with data mining algorithms and methods for data management
- ADMB – a software suite for non-linear statistical modeling based on C++ which uses automatic differentiation
- Chronux – for neurobiological time series data
- DAP – free replacement for SAS
- Environment for DeveLoping KDD-Applications Supported by Index-Structures (ELKI) a software framework for developing data mining algorithms in Java
- Epi Info – statistical software for epidemiology developed by Centers for Disease Control and Prevention (CDC). Apache 2 licensed
- Fityk – nonlinear regression software (GUI and command line)
- GNU Octave – programming language very similar to MATLAB with statistical features
- gretl – gnu regression, econometrics and time-series library
- intrinsic Noise Analyzer (iNA) – For analyzing intrinsic fluctuations in biochemical systems
- jamovi – A free GUI and library for R
- JASP – A free software alternative to IBM SPSS Statistics with additional option for Bayesian methods
- JMulTi – For econometric analysis, specialised in univariate and multivariate time series analysis
- Just another Gibbs sampler (JAGS) – a program for analyzing Bayesian hierarchical models using Markov chain Monte Carlo developed by Martyn Plummer. It is similar to WinBUGS
- KNIME – An open source analytics platform built with Java and Eclipse using modular data pipeline workflows
- LabPlot – A free and open-source, cross-platform computer program for interactive scientific plotting, curve fitting, nonlinear regression, data processing and data analysis
- LIBSVM – C++ support vector machine libraries
- mlpack – open-source library for machine learning, exploits C++ language features to provide maximum performance and flexibility while providing a simple and consistent application programming interface (API)
- Mondrian – data analysis tool using interactive statistical graphics with a link to R
- Neurophysiological Biomarker Toolbox – Matlab toolbox for data-mining of neurophysiological biomarkers
- OpenBUGS
- OpenEpi – A web-based, open-source, operating-independent series of programs for use in epidemiology and statistics based on JavaScript and HTML
- OpenMx – A package for structural equation modeling running in R (programming language)
- OpenNN – A software library written in the programming language C++ which implements neural networks, a main area of deep learning research
- Orange, a data mining, machine learning, and bioinformatics software
- Pandas – High-performance computing (HPC) data structures and data analysis tools for Python in Python and Cython (statsmodels, scikit-learn)
- Perl Data Language – Scientific computing with Perl
- Ploticus – software for generating a variety of graphs from raw data
- PSPP – A free software alternative to IBM SPSS Statistics
- R – free implementation of the S (programming language)
  - Programming with Big Data in R (pbdR) – a series of R packages enhanced by SPMD parallelism for big data analysis
  - R Commander – GUI interface for R
  - Rattle GUI – GUI interface for R
  - Revolution Analytics – production-grade software for the enterprise big data analytics
  - RStudio – GUI interface and development environment for R
- ROOT – an open-source C++ system for data storage, processing and analysis, developed by CERN and used to find the Higgs boson
- Salstat – menu-driven statistics software
- Scilab – uses GPL-compatible CeCILL license
- SciPy – Python library for scientific computing that contains the stats sub-package which is partly based on the venerable |STAT (a.k.a. PipeStat, formerly UNIX|STAT) software
  - scikit-learn – extends SciPy with a host of machine learning models (classification, clustering, regression, etc.)
- Shogun (toolbox) – open-source, large-scale machine learning toolbox that provides several SVM (Support Vector Machine) implementations (like libSVM, SVMlight) under a common framework and interfaces to Octave, MATLAB, Python, R
- Simfit – simulation, curve fitting, statistics, and plotting
- SOCR
- SOFA Statistics – desktop GUI program focused on ease of use, learn as you go, and beautiful output
- Stan (software) – open-source package for obtaining Bayesian inference using the No-U-Turn sampler, a variant of Hamiltonian Monte Carlo. It is somewhat like BUGS, but with a different language for expressing models and a different sampler for sampling from their posteriors
- Statistical Lab – R-based and focusing on educational purposes
- TOPCAT (software) – interactive graphical analysis and manipulation package for astronomers that understands FITS, VOTable and CDF formats.
- Torch (machine learning) – a deep learning software library written in Lua (programming language)
- Weka (machine learning) – a suite of machine learning software written at the University of Waikato

== Public domain ==
- CSPro (core is public domain but without publicly available source code; the web UI has been open sourced under Apache version 2 and the help system under GPL version 3)
- Dataplot (NIST)
- X-13ARIMA-SEATS (public domain in the United States only; outside of the United States is under US government copyright)

== Freeware ==
- BV4.1
- GeoDA
- MINUIT
- WinBUGS – Bayesian analysis using Markov chain Monte Carlo methods
- Winpepi – package of statistical programs for epidemiologists

== Proprietary ==
- Alteryx – analytics platform with drag and drop statistical models; R and Python integration
- Analytica – visual analytics and statistics package
- Angoss – products KnowledgeSEEKER and KnowledgeSTUDIO incorporate several data mining algorithms
- ASReml – for restricted maximum likelihood analyses
- BMDP – general statistics package
- DataGraph – online statistical software
- DB Lytix – 800+ in-database models
- EViews – for econometric analysis
- FAME (database) – a system for managing time-series databases
- GAUSS – programming language for statistics
- Genedata – software for integration and interpretation of experimental data in the life science R&D
- GenStat – general statistics package
- GLIM – early package for fitting generalized linear models
- GraphPad InStat – very simple with much guidance and explanations
- GraphPad Prism – biostatistics and nonlinear regression with clear explanations
- Igor Pro - programming language with statistical features and numerical analysis
- IMSL Numerical Libraries – software library with statistical algorithms
- JMP – visual analysis and statistics package
- LIMDEP – comprehensive statistics and econometrics package
- LISREL – statistics package used in structural equation modeling
- Maple – programming language with statistical features
- Mathematica – a software package with statistical particularly ŋ features
- MATLAB – programming language with statistical features
- MedCalc – for biomedical sciences
- Microfit – econometrics package, time series
- Minitab – general statistics package
- MLwiN – multilevel models (free to UK academics)
- NAG Numerical Library – comprehensive math and statistics library
- NCSS – general statistics package
- Neural Designer – commercial deep learning package
- NLOGIT – comprehensive statistics and econometrics package
- nQuery Sample Size Software – Sample Size and Power Analysis Software
- O-Matrix – programming language
- OriginPro – statistics and graphing, programming access to NAG library
- PASS Sample Size Software (PASS) – power and sample size software from NCSS
- Plotly – plotting library and styling interface for analyzing data and creating browser-based graphs. Available for R, Python, MATLAB, Julia, and Perl
- Primer-E Primer – environmental and ecological specific
- PV-WAVE – programming language comprehensive data analysis and visualization with IMSL statistical package
- Qlucore Omics Explorer – interactive and visual data analysis software
- RapidMiner – machine learning toolbox
- Regression Analysis of Time Series (RATS) – comprehensive econometric analysis package
- S-PLUS – general statistics package
- SAS (software) – comprehensive statistical package
- SHAZAM (Econometrics and Statistics Software) – comprehensive econometrics and statistics package
- SigmaStat – package for group analysis
- SIMUL – econometric tool for multidimensional (multi-sectoral, multi-regional) modeling
- SmartPLS – statistics package used in partial least squares path modeling (PLS) and PLS-based structural equation modeling
- SOCR – online tools for teaching statistics and probability theory
- Speakeasy (computational environment) – numerical computational environment and programming language with many statistical and econometric analysis features
- SPSS Modeler – comprehensive data mining and text analytics workbench
- SPSS Statistics – comprehensive statistics package
- Stata – comprehensive statistics package
- StatCrunch – comprehensive statistics package, originally designed for college statistics courses
- Statgraphics – general statistics package
- Statistica – comprehensive statistics package
- StatsDirect – statistics package designed for biomedical, public health and general health science uses
- StatXact – package for exact nonparametric and parametric statistics
- SuperCROSS – comprehensive statistics package with ad-hoc, cross tabulation analysis
- Systat – general statistics package
- The Unscrambler – free-to-try commercial multivariate analysis software for Windows
- WarpPLS – statistics package used in structural equation modeling
- Wolfram Language – the computer language that evolved from the program Mathematica. It has similar statistical capabilities as Mathematica.
- World Programming System (WPS) – statistical package that supports the use of Python, R and SAS languages within a single user program.
- XploRe

=== Add-ons ===
- Analyse-it – add-on to Microsoft Excel for statistical analysis
- Statgraphics Sigma Express – add-on to Microsoft Excel for Six Sigma statistical analysis
- SUDAAN – add-on to SAS and SPSS for statistical surveys
- XLfit add-on to Microsoft Excel for curve fitting and statistical analysis

== See also ==
- Comparison of statistical packages
- List of computer algebra systems
- List of information graphics software
- List of numerical libraries
- List of numerical-analysis software
- Mathematical software
- Psychometric software
- Statistics Online Computational Resource — open-source educational resource for statistics
