= Kst (software) =

Plotting and data viewing program

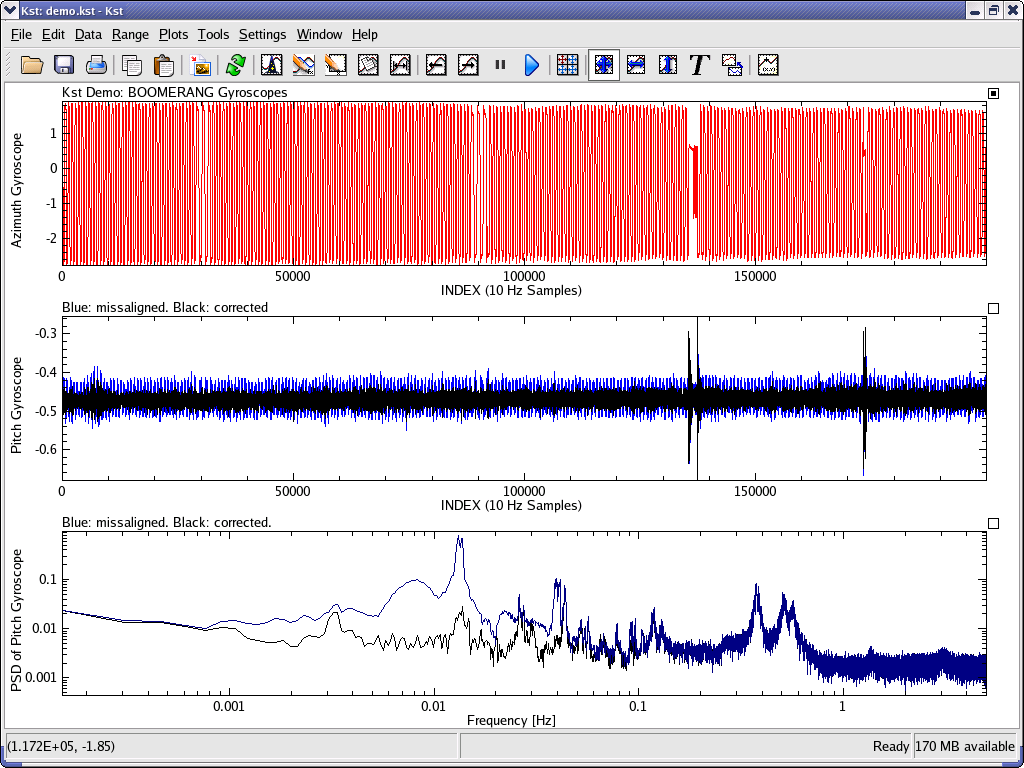
- Screenshot of Kst
- Original author: Barth Netterfield
- Developers: George Staikos; Andrew Walker
- Written in: C++
- Operating system: Linux; Mac; Windows using MinGW
- Type: Graph plotting software
- License: GPL
- Website: kst-plot.kde.org
- Repository: github.com/Kst-plot/kst

Kst is a plotting and data viewing program. It is a general purpose plotting software program that evolved out of a need to visualize and analyze astronomical data, but has also found subsequent use in the real time display of graphical information. Kst is a KDE application and is freely available for anyone to download and use under the terms of the GPL. It is noted for being able to graph real-time data acquisition.

== History ==
Kst was initially developed by Barth Netterfield, an astrophysicist as a personal project. By 2004 it had begun to be used in various universities and the European Space Agency and development was funded by the Canadian Space Agency. Kst is written in C++ and based upon (but does not use) the Tk toolkit. It is targeted towards large (million element) data sets.

== Features ==
kst is a fast real-time large-dataset plotting and viewing tool with basic data analysis functionality.

=== Plot types ===
kst is able to plot histograms and 3D with color and contour mapping for 3D images. It is also able to process Network Common Data Form (NETCDF) files for 2-d plotting

=== Real-time plotting capability ===
Kst has been chosen where there is a need to present plots in real-time.

=== Applications ===
Real-time applications vary in size from simple graphing of a sensor from a microcontroller such as arduino that may be set up by a hobbyist to a simple sensor to plotting of real time data from the Atacama Cosmology Telescope. The program has been recommended for real time graphical display of an open energy monitoring project.

=== Inputs ===
Kst is able to accept a number input formats with Dirfiles being particularly suitable for streaming applications and plug-in extension filters enabling other input stream types and file formats to be added.

=== Scripting language ===
The tool offers a scripting language, termed KstScript based upon JavaScript syntax which can help automate workflows.

== Alternatives ==
Some alternatives include MATLAB, Qtiplot, SciDAVis, Grace and LabPlot. However, some of these are part of a numerical analysis package.

== Spin-off developments ==
=== Dirfile format ===
In the process of developing the kst application a spin-off was the emergence of the Dirfile file format standard for time-ordered binary data in an efficient manner. (Note: The records in files are timestamped and ordered in time of occurrence) It was developed under the Getdata project into an independent standard with its own API.

== See also ==
- List of graphing software
- QtiPlot, for scientific graphing and data analysis
- SciDAVis
- LabPlot
- HippoDraw
