= CricketGraph =

Legacy graphics software for Apple Macintosh

- Developer: Cricket Software
- Release: 1986
- Platform: System 6
- Type: Graphics
- License: Commercial

CricketGraph was a graphic software program for the Apple Macintosh developed by Cricket Software (Jim Rafferty and Rich Norling) and sold until 1996. It could take tabulated data and create common business and statistics graphs such as bar chart, pie chart, scatter plots and radial plots. These graphs could be saved in common image formats such as PICT and EPS and added to other documents. It did not have the same capabilities as a spreadsheet.

== Competition ==
The main competitor was Visual Business. Other competitors were the built-in graphing packages in Microsoft Excel, Informix Wingz, and specialty statistics software such as Systat.

Although this package was written cleanly enough to run on much later versions of Classic Mac OS, the feature set was eventually superseded by packages such as DataGraph, DeltaGraph and KaleidaGraph.

== See also ==
- List of information graphics software
