= Fityk =

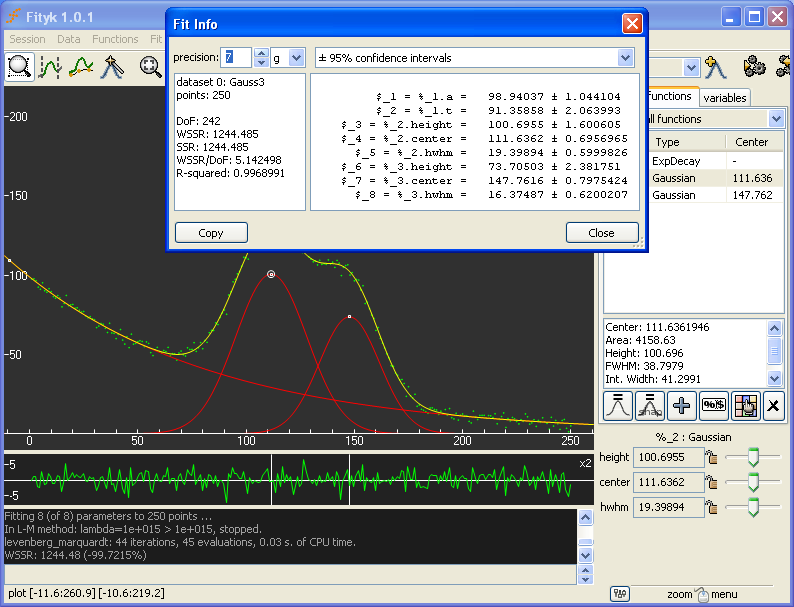
- Fityk 1.0.1 under Windows
- Developer: Marcin Wojdyr
- Initial release: 2004; 22 years ago
- Stable release: 1.3.1 / 19 December 2016; 9 years ago
- Written in: C++
- Operating system: Cross-platform
- Type: Curve fitting
- License: GNU GPL
- Website: fityk.nieto.pl
- Repository: github.com/wojdyr/fityk

Fityk is curve fitting and data analysis application, predominantly used to fit analytical, bell-shaped functions to experimental data. It is positioned to fill the gap between general plotting software and programs specific for one field, e.g. crystallography or XPS.

Originally, Fityk was developed to analyse powder diffraction data. It is also used in other fields that require peak analysis and peak-fitting, like chromatography or various kinds of spectroscopy.

Fityk is free and open source, distributed under the terms of GNU General Public License, with binaries/installers available free of charge on the project's website. It runs on Linux, macOS, Microsoft Windows, FreeBSD and other platforms. It operates either as a command line program or with a graphical user interface.

It is written in C++, using wxWidgets, and providing bindings for Python and other scripting languages.

== Features ==
- three weighted least squares methods:
  - Levenberg-Marquardt algorithm,
  - Nelder-Mead method
  - Genetic algorithm
- about 20 built-in functions and support for user-defined functions
- equality constraints
- data manipulations,
- handling series of datasets,
- automation of common tasks with scripts.

== Alternatives ==
The programs LabPlot, MagicPlot and peak-o-mat have similar scope.

More generic data analysis programs with spread-sheet capabilities include the proprietary Origin and its clones QtiPlot (paid, closed source) and SciDAVis (non-paid, open source).
