= Genotype frequency =

A De Finetti diagram visualizing genotype frequencies as distances to triangle edges x (AA), y (Aa) and z (aa) in a ternary plot. The curved line are the Hardy–Weinberg equilibria.

A Punnett square visualizing the genotype frequencies of a Hardy–Weinberg equilibrium as areas of a square. p (A) and q (a) are the allele frequencies.

Genetic variation in populations can be analyzed and quantified by the frequency of alleles. Two fundamental calculations are central to population genetics: allele frequencies and genotype frequencies. Genotype frequency in a population is the number of individuals with a given genotype divided by the total number of individuals in the population. In population genetics, the genotype frequency is the frequency or proportion (i.e., 0 < f < 1) of genotypes in a population.

Although allele and genotype frequencies are related, it is important to clearly distinguish them.

Genotype frequency may also be used in the future (for "genomic profiling") to predict someone's having a disease or even a birth defect. It can also be used to determine ethnic diversity.

Genotype frequencies may be represented by a De Finetti diagram.

== Numerical example ==
As an example, consider a population of 100 four-o-'clock plants (Mirabilis jalapa) with the following genotypes:

- 49 red-flowered plants with the genotype AA
- 42 pink-flowered plants with genotype Aa
- 9 white-flowered plants with genotype aa

When calculating an allele frequency for a diploid species, remember that homozygous individuals have two copies of an allele, whereas heterozygotes have only one. In our example, each of the 42 pink-flowered heterozygotes has one copy of the a allele, and each of the 9 white-flowered homozygotes has two copies. Therefore, the allele frequency for a (the white color allele) equals

$$\begin{align}
f({a}) & = { (Aa) + 2 \times (aa) \over 2 \times (AA) + 2 \times (Aa) + 2 \times (aa)} = { 42 + 2 \times 9 \over 2 \times 49 + 2 \times 42 + 2 \times 9 } = { 60 \over 200 } = 0.3 \\
\end{align}$$

This result tells us that the allele frequency of a is 0.3. In other words, 30% of the alleles for this gene in the population are the a allele.

Compare genotype frequency: let's now calculate the genotype frequency of aa homozygotes (white-flowered plants).

$$\begin{align}
f({aa}) & = { 9 \over 49 + 42 + 9 } = { 9 \over 100 } = 0.09 = (9\%) \\
\end{align}$$

Allele and genotype frequencies always sum to one (100%).

=== Equilibrium ===
The Hardy–Weinberg law describes the relationship between allele and genotype frequencies when a population is not evolving. Let's examine the Hardy–Weinberg equation using the population of four-o'clock plants that we considered above:
if the allele A frequency is denoted by the symbol p and the allele a frequency denoted by q, then p+q=1. For example, if p=0.7, then q must be 0.3. In other words, if the allele frequency of A equals 70%, the remaining 30% of the alleles must be a, because together they equal 100%.

For a gene that exists in two alleles, the Hardy–Weinberg equation states that (p^{2}) + (2pq) + (q^{2}) = 1. If we apply this equation to our flower color gene, then

$f(\mathbf{AA}) = p^2$ (genotype frequency of homozygotes)
$f(\mathbf{Aa}) = 2pq$ (genotype frequency of heterozygotes)
$f(\mathbf{aa}) = q^2$ (genotype frequency of homozygotes)

If p=0.7 and q=0.3, then

$f(\mathbf{AA}) = p^2$ = (0.7)^{2} = 0.49
$f(\mathbf{Aa}) = 2pq$ = 2×(0.7)×(0.3) = 0.42
$f(\mathbf{aa}) = q^2$ = (0.3)^{2} = 0.09

This result tells us that, if the allele frequency of A is 70% and the allele frequency of a is 30%, the expected genotype frequency of AA is 49%, Aa is 42%, and aa is 9%.

== Notes ==
- Brooker R, Widmaier E, Graham L, Stiling P (2011). Biology (2nd ed.). New York: McGraw-Hill. ISBN 978-0-07-353221-9.
