= SigmaPlot =

Computer software

- Developer: Grafiti LLC
- Stable release: 16.0 / 2024
- Operating system: Windows
- Type: Statistics software Graphing software
- License: Proprietary
- Website: SigmaPlot NG

SigmaPlot is a proprietary software package for scientific graphing and data analysis. It runs on Microsoft Windows.

The software can read multiple formats, such as Microsoft Excel spreadsheets, and can also perform mathematical transforms and statistical analyses. A single, perpetual product license costs between $899 and $1599 depending on academic, corporate, or government affiliation. This perpetual license cost may be inaccurate as Grafiti LLC requires a discussion of quote to receive a license now.

As of version 16, a free 30-day trial is available via the website.

== History ==
SigmaPlot was developed by Jandel Corporation for Windows 3.1x and maintained by them until version 4.0. In 1996, Jandel Corporation merged into SPSS Inc. SigmaPlot was maintained by SPSS through version 8. As of version 9, it was owned and maintained by SYSTAT Software, before SYSTAT was acquired by Inpixon on 6 July 2020.

The current versions are 16.x and SigmaPlot NG Foundation for Windows XP to Windows 10. It is now developed by Grafiti LLC.

== Alternatives and clones ==
The main competitors of SigmaPlot are currently Origin and GraphPad Prism. Open-source projects inspired by Origin include QtiPlot (prior to v0.9.9, now proprietary) and SciDAVis.
