= SigmaStat =

- Developer: Systat Software Inc.
- Stable release: 4.00 / February 1st, 2016
- Operating system: Windows
- Type: statistical analysis package
- License: proprietary
- Website: systatsoftware.com

SigmaStat is a statistical software package, which was originally developed by Jandel Scientific Software in the 1980s. As of October 1996, Systat Software is now based in San Jose, California. SigmaStat can compare effects among groups, conduct survival analysis, analyze rates and proportions, perform regression and correlation analysis and calculate power and sample size. The program uses a wizard-based interface which asks the user questions about the project and its data. After a test is run, the user receives a detailed report that interprets the results.

If installed with SigmaPlot, SigmaStat integrated with SigmaPlot and SigmaPlot gained advanced statistical analysis capabilities from version 11. SigmaStat is available both as a separate product or is available integrated with SigmaPlot.

On February 1, 2016, SigmaStat version 4 was relaunched as a separate Advisory Statistics Software by Systat Software Inc.

== Version history ==
- Version 1.0 : 1994
- Version 2.0 : 1997
- Version 3.0 : 2003
- Version 3.1 : 2005
- Version 3.5 : 2007 (integrated with SigmaPlot 10)
- Version 4.0 : 2008 (integrated with SigmaPlot 11)
- Version 4.00 : Relaunched as SigmaStat version 4.00 on February 1, 2016.
