= JLab =

JLab or JLAB may refer to:

- GroovyLab, a numerical computational environment formerly known as jLab
- JLab Audio, an American consumer audio brand founded in 2005
- Thomas Jefferson National Accelerator Facility, a US Department of Energy National Laboratory located in Newport News, Virginia, commonly called Jefferson Lab or JLab
