= Winplot =

- Graph of y = 2.25 - (x - 1.5)^2
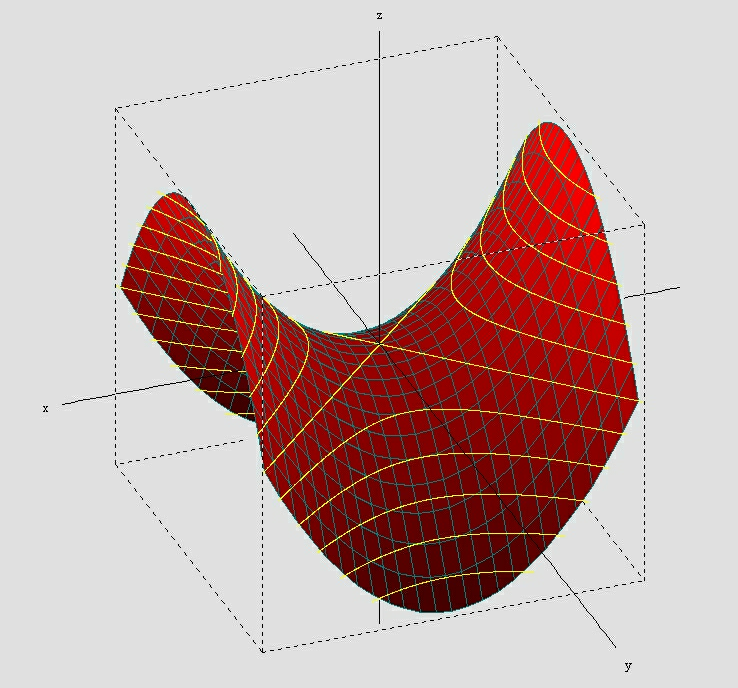
- A hyperbolic paraboloid plotted with Winplot
- Original author: Richard "Rick" Parris
- Developer: Rick Parris
- Initial release: 1985; 40 years ago
- Final release: 1.55 / 13 September 2012; 13 years ago
- Written in: C (until 2001), C++
- Operating system: Windows
- Size: 1.86 Mb
- Available in: 15 languages
- List of languages Chinese (traditional), Croatian, Dutch, English, French, German, Hungarian, Italian, Korean, Lithuanian, Polish, Portuguese, Russian, Slovak, Spanish
- Type: Plotting
- Licence: Freeware
- Website: faculty.madisoncollege.edu/alehnen/winptut/Install_Winplot.html

Winplot is a general-purpose plotting utility for Microsoft Windows that can draw (and animate) curves and surfaces presented in a variety of formats.

The final 2012 release of Winplot can run on Windows 95, 98, Me, 2000, XP, Vista, 7. It may also run on Windows 8, 10, and 11. It is a 32-bit application. It is released as freeware, with no source code available, as its author, Rick Parris, did not want to relinquish control of development, and felt his code was lengthy and badly documented.

Rick Parris died on October 23, 2012. He was 67. Some time after his death, Phillips Exeter Academy stopped hosting his official Winplot website, so an alternative link is provided.

== Features ==
Winplot can generate both 2D and 3D plots of functions and sequences. It can also animate these plots using up to 23 variables and their corresponding sliders. Only one slider may be animated at a time. It also has various export options including EPS, SVG, PiCTeX, Metafile, and simple copying to the Windows clipboard.

Unlike most other free plotting software, Winplot can plot implicit functions, slope fields, and intrinsic curves, and perform several standard calculus operations on the functions, such as generating graphs of cross-sectional solids and solids of revolution, tracing trajectories on slope fields given an initial point, and calculating line and surface integrals.
