= StatsDirect =

- Developer: StatsDirect Ltd
- Stable release: Ver. 3.2.7 / May 30, 2019; 7 years ago
- Operating system: Windows
- Type: Statistical analysis
- License: proprietary
- Website: www.statsdirect.com

StatsDirect is a statistical software package designed for biomedical, public health, and general health science uses. The second generation of the software was reviewed in general medical and public health journals.

== Features and use ==
StatsDirect's interface is menu driven and has editors for spreadsheet-like data and reports. The function library includes common medical statistical methods that can be extended by users via an XML-based description that can embed calls to native StatsDirect numerical libraries, R scripts, or algorithms in any of the .NET languages (such as C#, VB.Net, J#, or F#).

Common statistical misconceptions are challenged by the interface. For example, users can perform a chi-square test on a two-by-two table, but they are asked whether the data are from a cohort (perspective) or case-control (retrospective) study before delivering the result. Both processes produce a chi-square test result but more emphasis is put on the appropriate statistic for the inference, which is the odds ratio for retrospective studies and relative risk for prospective studies.

== Origins ==
Professor Iain Buchan, formerly of the University of Manchester, wrote a doctoral thesis on the foundational work and is credited as the creator of the software. Buchan said he wished to address the problem of clinicians lacking the statistical knowledge to select and interpret statistical functions correctly, and often misusing software written by and for statisticians as a result.

The software debuted in 1989 as Arcus, then Arcus ProStat in 1993, both written for the DOS platform. Arcus Quickstat for Windows followed in 1999. In 2000, an expanded version, StatsDirect, was released for Microsoft Windows. In 2013, the third generation of this software was released, written in C# for the .NET platform.

StatsDirect reports embed the metadata necessary to replay calculations, which may be needed if the original data is ever updated. The reproducible report technology follows the research object approach for replaying in "eLabs".
