= De Finetti diagram =

Ternary plot used in population genetics

A de Finetti diagram. The curved line is the expected Hardy–Weinberg frequency as a function of p.

A de Finetti diagram is a ternary plot used in population genetics. It is named after the Italian statistician Bruno de Finetti (1906–1985) and is used to graph the genotype frequencies of populations, where there are two alleles and the population is diploid. It is based on an equilateral triangle, and Viviani's theorem: the sum of the perpendicular distances from any interior point to the sides of said triangle is a constant equal to the length of the triangle's altitude.

== Applications in genetics ==
The de Finetti diagram is used extensively in A.W.F. Edwards' book "Foundations of Mathematical Genetics". The sum of the lengths, representing allele frequencies, is set to be 1. In its simplest form the diagram can be used to show the range of genotype frequencies for which Hardy–Weinberg equilibrium is satisfied (the curve within the diagram). A. W. F. Edwards and Chris Cannings extended its use to demonstrate the changes that occur in allele frequencies under natural selection.

== See also ==
- Ternary diagram
- Wahlund effect
