= MLwiN =

- Developers: Centre for Multilevel Modelling; University of Bristol
- Stable release: 2.34 / July 13, 2015; 11 years ago
- Operating system: Windows
- Type: Econometrics software
- License: Proprietary
- Website: bristol.ac.uk/cmm/software/mlwin

MLwiN is a statistical software package for fitting multilevel models. It uses both maximum likelihood estimation and Markov chain Monte Carlo (MCMC) methods. MLwiN is based on an earlier package, MLn, but with a graphical user interface (as well as other additional features). MLwiN represents multilevel models using mathematical notation including Greek letters and multiple subscripts, so the user needs to be (or become) familiar with such notation.

For a tutorial introduction to multilevel models and their applications in medical statistics illustrated using MLwiN, see Goldstein et al.
