= Rattle GUI =

Interface for using the R programming language

- Original author: Graham Williams
- Developer: Graham Williams
- Stable release: 6.5.30 / 5 May 2026; 24 days ago
- Written in: R
- Type: GUI widget toolkit
- License: GNU General Public License
- Website: rattle.togaware.com

Rattle GUI is a free and open source software (GNU GPL v2) package providing a graphical user interface (GUI) for data mining using the R statistical programming language. Rattle is used in a variety of situations. Currently there are 15 different government departments in Australia, in addition to various other organisations around the world, which use Rattle in their data mining activities and as a statistical package.

Rattle provides considerable data mining functionality by exposing the power of the R Statistical Software through a graphical user interface. Rattle is also used as a teaching facility to learn the R software Language. There is a Log Code tab, which replicates the R code for any activity undertaken in the GUI, which can be copied and pasted. Rattle can be used for statistical analysis, or model generation. Rattle allows for the dataset to be partitioned into training, validation and testing. The dataset can be viewed and edited. There is also an option for scoring an external data file.

Rattle was originally released in early 2006 and relaunched in 2025. The relaunch replaced the dated R interface with a modern look using the Flutter framework and includes new modules to input R code as well predefined code modules.

== Features ==
- File Inputs = CSV, TXT, Excel, ARFF, ODBC, R Dataset, RData File, Library Packages Datasets, Corpus, and Scripts.
- Statistics = Min, Max, Quartiles, Mean, St Dev, Missing, Medium, Sum, Variance, Skewness, Kurtosis, chi square.
- Statistical tests = Correlation, Wilcoxon-Smirnov, Wilcoxon Rank Sum, T-Test, F-Test, and Wilcoxon Signed Rank.
- Clustering = KMeans, Clara, Hierarchical, and BiCluster.
- Modeling = Decision Trees, Random Forests, ADA Boost, Support Vector Machine, Logistic Regression, and Neural Net.
- Evaluation = Confusion Matrix, Risk Charts, Cost Curve, Hand, Lift, ROC, Precision, Sensitivity.
- Charts = Box Plot, Histogram, Correlations, Dendrograms, Cumulative, Principal Components, Benford, Bar Plot, Dot Plot, and Mosaic.
- Transformations = Rescale (Recenter, Scale 0–1, Median/MAD, Natural Log, and Matrix) - Impute ( Zero/Missing, Mean, Median, Mode & Constant), Recode (Binning, Kmeans, Equal Widths, Indicator, Join Categories) - Cleanup (Delete Ignored, Delete Selected, Delete Missing, Delete Obs with Missing)

Rattle also uses two external graphical investigation / plotting tools. Latticist and GGobi are independent applications which provide highly dynamic and interactive graphic data visualisation for exploratory data analysis.

== Packages ==
The capabilities of R are extended through user-submitted packages, which allow specialized statistical techniques, graphical devices, as well as import/export capabilities to many external data formats. Rattle uses these packages - RGtk2, pmml, colorspace, ada, amap, arules, biclust, cba, descr, doBy, e1071, ellipse, fEcofin, fBasics, foreign, fpc, gdata, gtools, gplots, gWidgetsRGtk2, Hmisc, kernlab, latticist, Matrix, mice, network, nnet, odfWeave, party, playwith, psych, randomForest, reshape, RGtk2Extras, ROCR, RODBC, rpart, RSvgDevice, survival, timeDate, graph, RBGL, bitops,

== See also ==
- R interfaces
