= FlexPro =

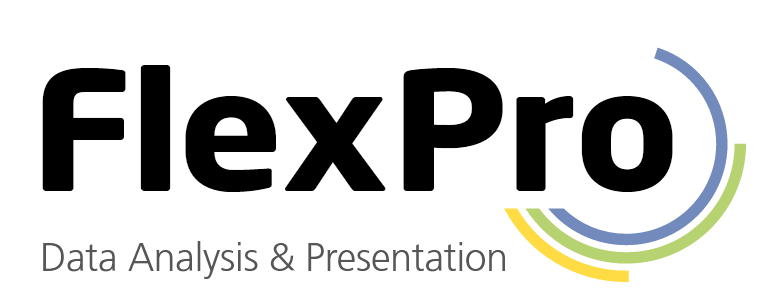
- Developer: Weisang GmbH
- Release: 1991; 35 years ago
- Stable release: 2025
- Operating system: Microsoft Windows
- Available in: English, German, Japanese, Chinese, French
- Type: Numerical analysis, Data Analysis, plotting
- License: Proprietary
- Website: www.weisang.com

FlexPro is a proprietary software package for analysis and presentation of scientific and technical data, produced by Weisang GmbH. It runs on Microsoft Windows and is available in English, German, Japanese, Chinese and French. FlexPro has its roots in the test and measurement domain and supports different binary file formats of data acquisition instruments and software. In particular, FlexPro can analyze large amounts of data with high sampling rates.

== Features ==
FlexPro is a software application for analyzing and presenting data. All data, analyses and presentations are stored in an object database. The structure of the database is similar to a file system on a hard drive. It is possible to build up a hierarchy of folders in FlexPro to organize the analysis. An entire FlexPro database can be stored in one file with size limited only by the hard drive space - not limited by the computer's RAM. The FlexPro user interface is based on Microsoft Office-like Ribbon technology.

FlexPro provides wizards to create different 2D and 3D graphs as well as tables for data presentation. Typical graphs featured are line, symbol, scatter, bar, contour, waterfall, surface and polar plots. FlexPro also supports the media object (video format). FlexPro lets you create multi-page reports directly in the FlexPro project database.

FlexPro has a built-in programming language, FPScript, which is optimized for data analysis and supports direct operations on non-scalar objects such as vectors and matrices as well as composed data structures like signals, signal series or surfaces. All operations can be executed either graphically (through menus or dialog boxes) or programmatically. Programmatic access is provided through an Automation Object Model and the built-in Microsoft Visual Basic for Applications Development Environment (VBA).

Data can be analyzed either graphically using cursors in 2D or 3D graphs or mathematically using analysis objects or FPScript formulas. The underlying algorithm of an analysis object can be parameterized through a property sheet. Raw data, analysis objects and presentation objects like graphs, tables and documents form a dynamic network which can be updated after new data has been imported. FlexPro supports time and frequency domain signal analysis, spectral analysis, order tracking, linear and non-linear curve fitting, descriptive and inductive statistics, event isolation, acoustics, FIR and IIR filtering as well as counting procedures (e.g., Rainflow-counting).

FlexPro Project Database

FlexPro carries out all calculations not only with numbers, but also with physical quantities composed of a value and unit. In addition to SI units, FlexPro also handles popular non-SI units such as Gaussian units and US units.

FlexPro can export publication-quality graphs and reports to a number of file formats, including HTML, JPEG, PNG, and WMF.

FlexPro’s Data Explorer indexes data archives on the hard drive or server. Configurable queries can be used to search for characteristic values or other data attributes and to find the data records to be evaluated. It is also possible to set up user-defined calculations during the indexing process which can be used for further data analysis.

FlexPro supports various data files for import (standard file formats and binary file formats of data acquisition instruments and software): e.g. text and ASCII data (.csv and .txt), Excel workbooks, media files, wave files, ODBC data source, Matlab (.mat), National Instruments (.tdm, .tdms), ASAM ODS and ASAM COMMON MDF4, IMC Famos, NASA-CDF, Dewetron, DEWESoft, Graphtec, Hioki, IMC, Nicolet/Gould, OROS, SEFRAM, Viper, TEAC, Sony, Tektronik, Powermeter, Catman, Caesar, Imtec, Stemmer, Yokogawa, SPSS, LabView, Diadem, TurboLab, Systat, TableCurve.

== See also ==
- List of information graphics software
- List of numerical analysis software
