= GroovyLab =

- Initial release: January 1, 2014; 12 years ago
- Stable release: 2020 / December 6, 2020; 5 years ago
- Type: Technical computing
- License: GNU GPL v2
- Website: https://github.com/sterglee/GroovyLab

GroovyLab, formerly jLab, is a numerical computational environment implemented in Java. The main scripting engine of GroovyLab is GroovySci, an extension of Groovy. Additionally, the interpreted Groovy Scripts (similar to MATLAB) and dynamic linking to Java class code are supported.

The GroovyLab environment provides a MATLAB/Scilab scientific computing platform that is supported by scripting engines implemented in the Java language. GroovyLab 4.0.0-alpha-2 provides GroovySci, which is a compiled scripting language based on GroovyShell.

== See also ==
- List of numerical-analysis software
