= DataGraph =

Graphing and data analysis software

- Screenshot DataGraph user interface with data inspection tool
- Developer(s): Visual Data Tools, Inc.
- Initial release: 2006; 19 years ago
- Stable release: 5.5 / 17 July 2025; 0 days ago
- Operating system: macOS
- Type: Graphing software
- Website: visualdatatools.com/DataGraph

DataGraph is a graphing and data analysis software application for the macOS operating system, developed by Visual Data Tools in Chapel Hill, NC. DataGraph is used for creating publication quality graphics, particularly for research and science.

Visual Data Tools was founded in 2002. In 2005, Visual Data Tools was awarded an Apple Design award for the Best Mac OS X Scientific Computing Solution for DataTank. In 2006, Visual Data Tools released DataGraph, initially called DataPlot. In 2011, DataGraph was among the first applications available on the mac App store.

Both DataTank and DataGraph were created by David Adalsteinsson, a Professor of Mathematics at the University of North Carolina at Chapel Hill.

== See also ==
- List of statistical software
