= Xgraph =

Xgraph is the name of at least two applications for 2-D interactive plotting, graphing and animation.

== Hein's XGRAPH ==
In 1984, Carl Hein of Lockheed Martin Advanced Technology Labs developed XGRAPH. Hein's XGRAPH is available in binary format for various platforms.

== Harrison's xgraph ==
In 1989, David Harrison of the University of California, Berkeley, released xgraph for X11R3 of X Window. Various versions of Harrison's xgraph are available in source and binary format for various platforms. Harrison's xgraph is released under the BSD License.
