= Think-cell =

German computer software company

think-cell Software GmbH
- Type: Private
- Industry: Computer software
- Founded: Berlin, Germany (2002)
- Founder: Markus Hannebauer (Chairman); Arno Schödl, Ph.D.
- Headquarters: Berlin, Germany
- Area served: Worldwide
- Key people: Alexander von Fritsch (CEO); Dr. Christian Klöckner (CTO); Adam Conlon (CFO & COO)
- Products: thinkcell Suite; thinkcell Assist; thinkcell Essentials
- Parent: Cinven
- Website: www.thinkcell.com

think-cell Software GmbH (doing business as thinkcell) is a German computer software company founded in April 2002, and headquartered in Berlin, Germany. Originally a Fraunhofer Society spin-off and now owned by the private equity firm Cinven, the company produces Microsoft PowerPoint and Excel plug-in software products.

The company's main product, which is also called thinkcell, facilitates the creation of charts, e.g., bar charts, waterfall charts, Marimekko charts and Gantt charts, on Microsoft PowerPoint presentation slides from Microsoft Excel data sheets. Some features overlap with those provided by newer versions of Microsoft Office, such as the waterfall charts that became a built-in feature in Office 2016.

The company was ranked fourth in Deloitte Germany's 2009 Technology Fast 50 Awards, with a revenue growth rate of 3,150% over the previous five years.

In June 2021, the British private equity firm Cinven purchased a majority stake in the company for an undisclosed sum, and Civen issued a press release saying that the software was used by 8 of the top 10 global consulting firms, 80% of the Fortune 100, the entire DAX 30, and 9 of the top 10 US business schools.

In September 2023, thinkcell acquired AskBrian, a Wolfratshausen-headquartered AI assistant company, for an undisclosed amount.

In June 2026, thinkcell released an AI-based product, think-cell Assist, for PowerPoint and Excel.
