= QtiPlot =

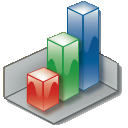

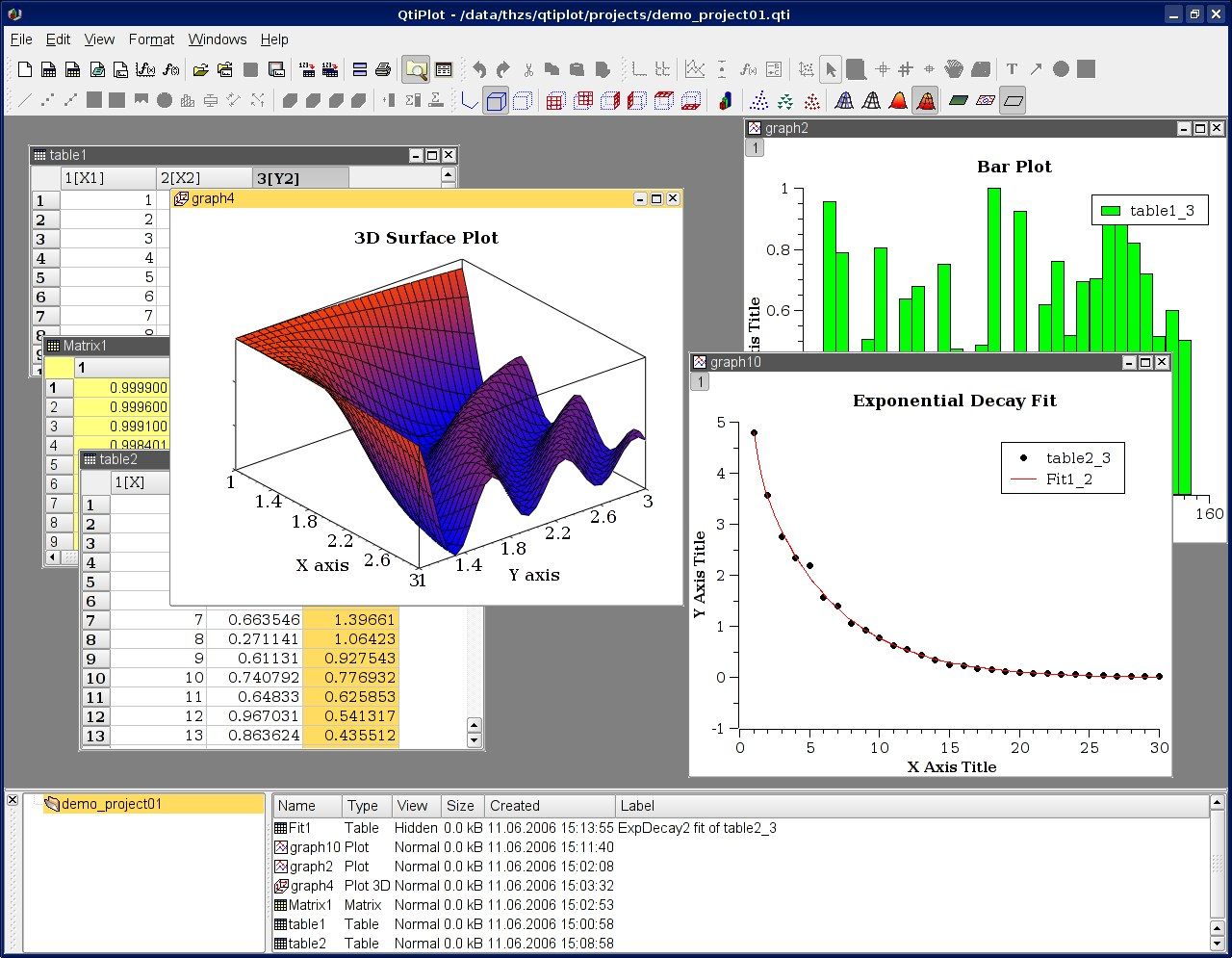
- Screenshot of QtiPlot 0.8.5 of 2006
- Original author: Ion Vasilief
- Stable release: 1.2.7 / 20 May 2026; 1 day ago
- Written in: C++, Python
- Operating system: Cross-platform
- Type: Plotting
- License: commercial
- Website: www.qtiplot.com

QtiPlot is a cross-platform computer program for interactive scientific graphing and data analysis. It is similar to Origin or SigmaPlot.

QtiPlot can be used to present 2D and 3D data and has various data analysis functions like curve fitting. Plotting of 3D data can be rendered using OpenGL using the Qwt3D libraries.

The program is also extensible to a considerable degree via muParser and Python scripting language, which allows adding the arbitrary user-defined functions with access to graphs, matrices and data tables.

Older QtiPlot versions up to 0.9.8.9 were released under the terms of the GNU General Public License (GPL) and are available also as binaries for Linux distribution repositories as well as for Windows.

Starting with version 0.9.9 the source code is not available from the author anymore. Compiled binaries are available for Microsoft Windows, several Linux distributions and Mac OS X, including the new ARM M1 chips; downloading binaries from the author's website requires purchase of an annual maintenance contract. Files saved by version 0.9.9 cannot be loaded by version 0.9.8.

== Alternatives ==
- SciDAVis, forked from QtiPlot in 2007
- LabPlot, free, open source and cross-platform
- Fityk, MagicPlot more focused on curve fitting
- peak-o-mat, similar to Fityk
- HippoDraw, focussed on graphing
- Veusz, written in Python
- ParaView, for visualizing huge datasets
- gnuplot, command-line program for two- and three-dimensional plots
