= Sysquake =

Numerical computing software

- Developer: Calerga Sarl
- Stable release: 6.5 / December 2019
- Operating system: Microsoft Windows, Mac OS X, Linux
- Type: Technical computing
- License: Proprietary
- Website: Sysquake product page

Sysquake is a numerical computing environment and a programming language mostly-compatible with MATLAB. It offers facilities for interactive graphics which give insights into the problems being analyzed. It is used in teaching, research, and engineering.

Sysquake supports two kinds of codes: libraries (collections of related functions which extend Sysquake capabilities), and SQ files, applications with interactive graphics which can have their own menus. Sysquake Pro can also be extended with plugins.

== Code ==
Several applications share a large part of Sysquake code:

Sysquake Application Builder
program which creates stand-alone executable applications (bundled with Sysquake Pro)
Sysquake for LaTeX
Sysquake's language and graphics directly in LaTeX (package file and compiled application)

Libraries are usually compatible with all these applications.

== History ==
Sysquake 3 supported MySQL and SQLite databases, TCP/IP and audio input and output.

== See also ==
- List of numerical analysis software
