= LabPlot =

Application for interactive graphing and analysis of scientific data

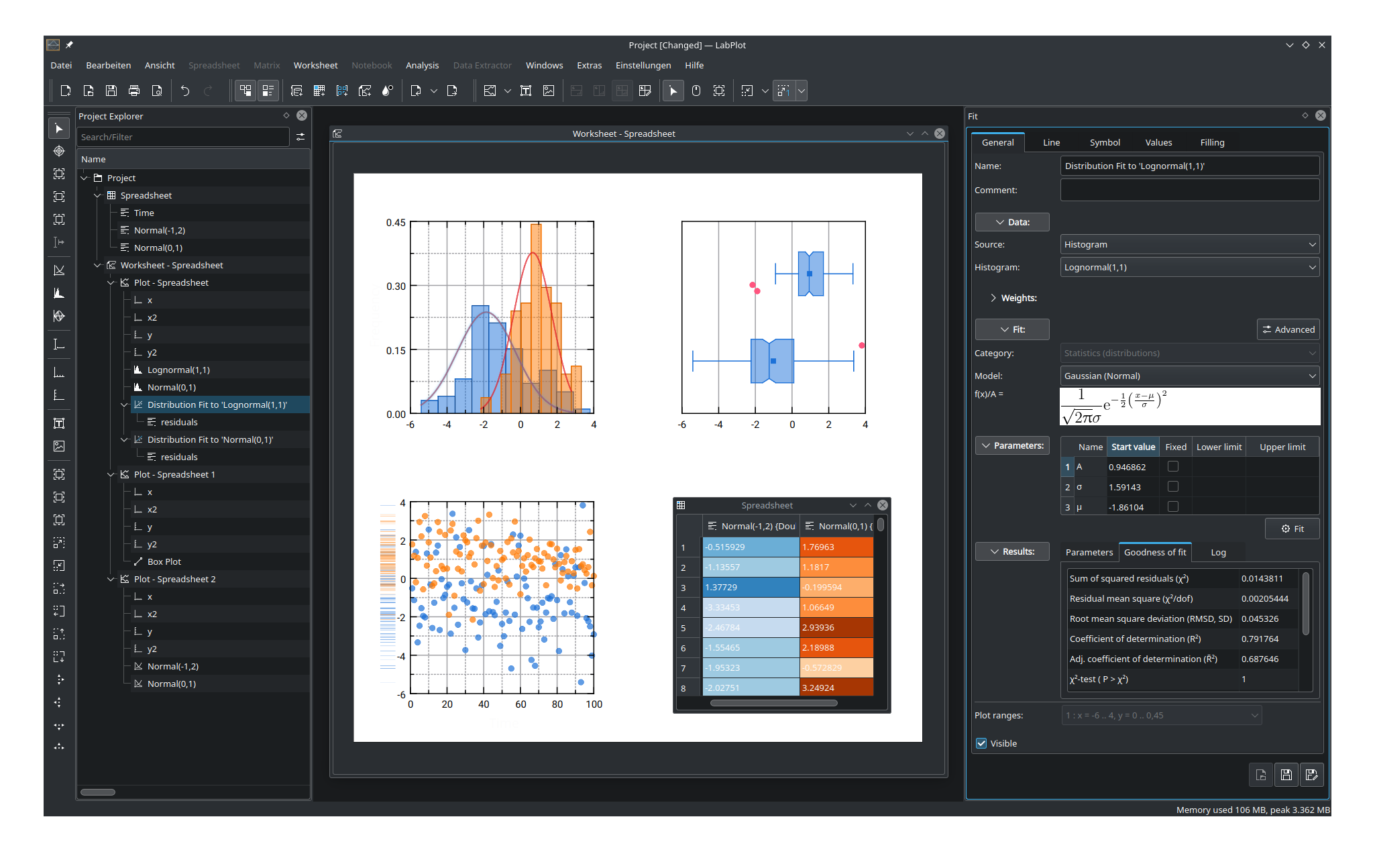
- Screenshot of LabPlot of 2022
- Original author: Stefan Gerlach
- Developer: KDE
- Release: 2001; 25 years ago (version 0.1, under the name QPlot); 2003; 23 years ago (version 1.0, renamed to LabPlot)
- Stable release: 2.12.1 / 18 August 2025; 11 months ago
- Preview release: 3.0 / 8 February 2025; 17 months ago; master build
- Written in: C, C++
- Operating system: Windows; OS X Linux; FreeBSD; Haiku
- Type: Scientific plotting Data analysis Curve fitting Regression analysis Statistical analysis Data processing Plot digitization Notebook interface Real-time data
- License: GPL-2.0-or-later
- Website: labplot.kde.org
- Repository: invent.kde.org/education/labplot

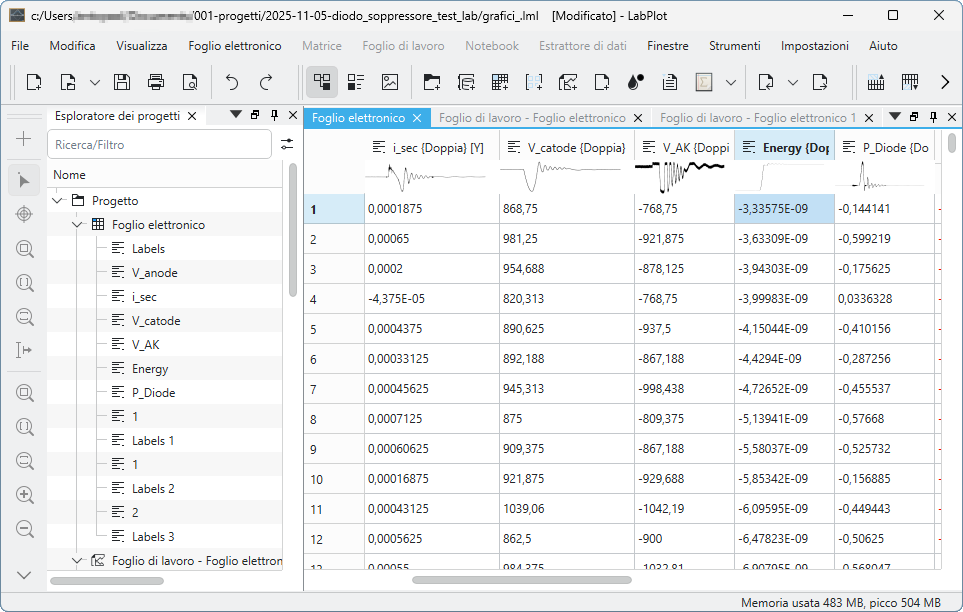
LabPlot can draw sparklines at top of the data columns to show a quick glance of the data before plotting them.

LabPlot is a free and open-source, cross-platform computer program for interactive scientific plotting, curve fitting, nonlinear regression, data processing and data analysis. LabPlot is available, under the GPL-2.0-or-later license, for Windows, macOS, Linux, FreeBSD and Haiku operating systems.

It has a graphical user interface, a command-line interface, and an interactive and animated notebook interface. It is similar to Origin and able to import Origin's data files. Features include the Hilbert transform function, statistics, color maps, conditional formatting, plot digitization and multi-axes.

== History ==
In 2008, developers of LabPlot and SciDAVis (another Origin clone, forked from QtiPlot) "found their project goals to be very similar" and decided to merge their code into a common backend while maintaining two frontends: LabPlot, integrated with the KDE desktop environment (DE); and SciDAVis, written in DE-independent Qt with fewer dependencies for easier cross-platform use.

Starting April 2024, LabPlot received funding from NLnet's NGI0 Core grant to add scripting capabilities (via Python and a public interface), more data analysis functions, and statistical analysis features.

== See also ==
- List of statistical software
- List of information graphics software
