= MagicPlot =

Data analysis and plotting software

- Developers: Magicplot Systems, LLC
- Initial release: 2008
- Stable release: 3.2 / 2026; 0 years ago
- Written in: Java
- Operating system: Cross-platform
- Type: Data analysis
- License: Proprietary
- Website: www.magicplot.com

MagicPlot is a technical plotting, curve fitting and data analysis application. It provides a wide usage of the graphical user interface for data exploration as well as various statistical analysis tools, peak fitting options, raster or vector formats of publishable plots.

MagicPlot is a commercial software. Some functions are limited after trial period.
