= SciDAVis =

Data analysis and visualization program

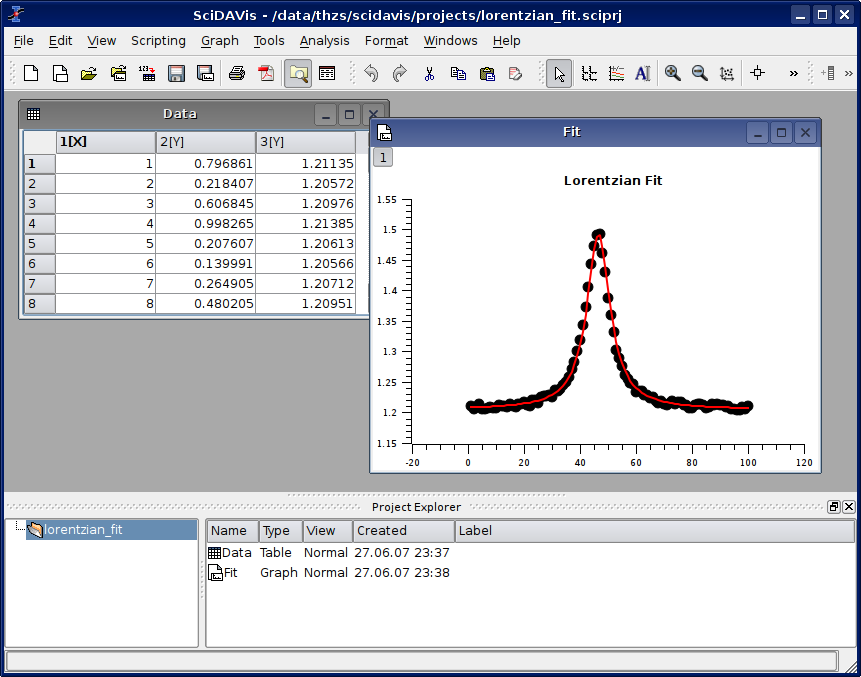
- Screenshot of SciDAVis 0.1.0 on Linux
- Original authors: Tilman Benkert, Knut Franke
- Developers: Miquel Garriga, Arun Narayanankutty, Dmitriy Pozitron, Russell Standish
- Initial release: 5 August 2007; 18 years ago
- Stable release: 2.9.2 / 16 April 2022; 3 years ago
- Written in: C++, Python
- Operating system: Microsoft Windows, OS X, Linux
- Platform: x86, AMD64
- Size: 42.9 MB (Windows), 86.3 MB (Mac), 9.8 MB (Source code)
- Available in: 11 languages
- Type: Data analysis and plotting
- License: GNU GPLv2
- Website: scidavis.sourceforge.net
- Repository: https://github.com/SciDAVis/scidavis
- As of: 9 January 2021

SciDAVis (Scientific Data Analysis and Visualization) is an open-source cross-platform computer program for interactive scientific graphing and data analysis. Development started in 2007 as fork of QtiPlot, which in turn is a clone of the proprietary program Origin.

== Features ==
SciDAVis can generate different types of 2D and 3D plots (such as line, scatter, bar, pie, and surface plots) from data that is either imported from ASCII files, entered by hand, or calculated using formulas. The data is held in spreadsheets, which are referred to as tables with column-based data (typically X and Y values for 2D plots) or matrices (for 3D plots). The spreadsheets, as well as graphs and note windows, are gathered in a project and can be organized using folders. The built-in analysis operations include column/row statistics, (de)convolution, FFT and FFT-based filters. Curve fitting can be performed with user-defined or built-in linear and nonlinear functions, including multi-peak fitting, based on the GNU Scientific Library. The plots can be exported to several bitmap formats, PDF, EPS or SVG. Note windows support in-place evaluation of mathematical expressions or an optional scripting interface to Python. The GUI of the application uses the Qt toolkit.

== History ==
SciDAVis was founded by Tilman Benkert and Knut Franke in 2007 as a fork of QtiPlot, after disagreements arose with Ion Vasilief, the founder and main developer of the project. Franke has stated that the topics of disagreement included "design goals, management of community resources and the right way to make money from a free software project".

In 2008, developers of SciDAVis and LabPlot "found their project goals to be very similar" and "decided to start a close cooperation" with the aim of merging their code into a common backend, while maintaining "two frontends, one with full KDE4 integration (called LabPlot 2.x) and one with no KDE dependencies (pure Qt so to say) for easier cross-platform use (called SciDAVis)". This never actually happened, and 10 years later both continue to be separate parallel projects without any kind of (at least publicly available) collaboration, joint agreement or declaration/proposal, code merging, not any other way of cooperation or joint efforts. After stalled development for several years, updates to SciDAVis have resumed.

=== Release history ===
- 2007-08-05: Release 0.1.0
- 2007-12-21: Release 0.1.1
- 2008-02-03: Release 0.1.2
- 2008-04-19: Release 0.1.3
- 2009-02-10: Release 0.1.4
- 2009-02-14: Release 0.2.0
- 2009-03-09: Release 0.2.1
- 2009-04-20: Release 0.2.2
- 2009-07-12: Release 0.2.3
- 2010-03-12: Release 0.2.4
- 2014-01-23: Release 1.D1
- 2014-02-05: Release 1.D4
- 2014-03-21: Release 1.D5
- 2014-08-26: Release 1.D8
- 2015-11-24: Release 1.D9
- 2016-06-05: Release 1.D13
- 2016-07-29: Release 1.14
- 2017-06-01: Release 1.17
- 2017-06-21: Release 1.18
- 2017-07-19: Release 1.19
- 2017-08-09: Release 1.21
- 2017-10-22: Release 1.22
- 2018-06-04: Release 1.23
- 2019-03-05: Release 1.25
- 2019-12-18: Release 1.26
- 2020-04-30: Release 2.1
- 2020-06-12: Release 2.3
- 2021-05-05: Release 2.4
- 2022-02-12: Release 2.7
- 2022-04-13: Release 2.8
- 2022-04-16: Release 2.9
- 2022-04-16: Release 2.9.1
- 2022-04-16: Release 2.9.2

== See also ==
- List of graphing software
