= Origin (data analysis software) =

Scientific data analysis software

- Developer: OriginLab Corporation
- Stable release: 2026 SR1 / January 2026; 10 months ago
- Operating system: Microsoft Windows
- Available in: English, German, Chinese and Japanese.
- Type: Data analysis
- License: Proprietary
- Website: www.originlab.com

Origin is a proprietary computer program for interactive scientific graphing and data analysis. It is produced by OriginLab Corporation, and runs on Microsoft Windows. It has inspired several platform-independent open-source clones and alternatives like LabPlot and SciDAVis.

Graphing support in Origin includes various 2D/3D plot types. Data analyses in Origin include statistics, signal processing, curve fitting and peak analysis. Origin's curve fitting is performed by a nonlinear least squares fitter which is based on the Levenberg–Marquardt algorithm.

Origin imports data files in various formats such as ASCII text, Excel, NI TDM, DIADem, NetCDF, SPC, etc. It also exports the graph to various image file formats such as JPEG, GIF, EPS, TIFF, etc. There is also a built-in query tool for accessing database data via ADO.

== Features ==
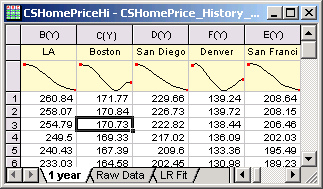
Origin Workbook with sparklines above data columns; this allows a quick glance of the data without plotting them.

Origin is primarily a GUI software with a spreadsheet front end. Unlike popular spreadsheets like Excel, Origin's worksheet is column oriented. Each column has associated attributes like name, units and other user definable labels. Instead of cell formula, Origin uses column formula for calculations.

Recent versions of Origin have introduced and expanded on batch capabilities, with the goal of eliminating the need to program many routine operations. Instead the user relies on customizable graph templates, analysis dialog box Themes which save a particular suite of operations, auto recalculation on changes to data or analysis parameters, and Analysis Templates™ which save a collection of operations within the workbook.

Origin also has a scripting language (LabTalk) for controlling the software, which can be extended using a built-in C/C++-based compiled language (Origin C). Other programming options include an embedded Python environment, and an R Console plus support for Rserve.

Origin can be also used as a COM server for programs which may be written in Visual Basic .NET, C#, LabVIEW, etc.

Older (.OPJ), but not newer (.OPJU), Origin project files can be read by the open-source LabPlot or SciDAVis software. The native origin file viewer can read them and can convert newer OPJU files to older OPJ files for older versions of Origin. The files can also be read by QtiPlot but only with a paid "Pro" version. Finally the liborigin library can also read. OPJ files such as by using the opj2dat script, which exports the data tables contained in the file.

There is also a free component (Orglab) maintained by Originlab that can be used to create (or read) OPJ files. A free Viewer application is also available.

== History ==
Origin was first created for use solely with microcalorimeters manufactured by MicroCal Inc. (acquired by Malvern Instruments in 2014) The software was used to graph the instruments data, and perform nonlinear curve fitting and parameter calculation.

The software was first published for the public in 1992 by Microcal Software, which later was renamed to OriginLab Corporation, located in Northampton, Massachusetts.

=== Editions and support ===
Origin is available in two editions, the regular version Origin and the pricier OriginPro. The latter adds additional data analysis features like surface fitting, short-time Fourier Transform, and more advanced statistics. A few version types have been offered from Origin and OriginPro as personal, academic, government and student versions.
