= ROOT =

Data analysis software

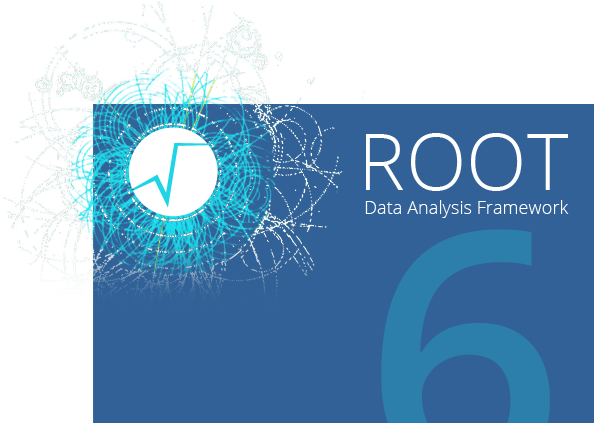

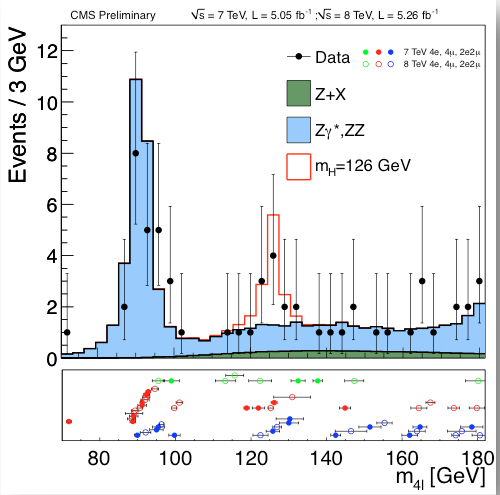
- The CMS experiments presented on July 4, 2012, the status of the Standard Model Higgs search. All plots presented that day used ROOT.
- Original authors: René Brun, Fons Rademakers
- Developer: CERN
- Stable release: 6.40.04 / August 27, 2026; 32 days ago
- Written in: C++
- Operating system: Microsoft Windows, OS X, Linux, Solaris, IBM AIX
- Platform: IA-32, x86-64
- Size: 86–327 MB
- Type: Data analysis, Plotting
- License: LGPL/GPL
- Website: root.cern
- Repository: github.com/root-project/root

ROOT is an object-oriented computer program and library developed by CERN. It was originally designed for particle physics data analysis and contains several features specific to the field, but it is also used in other applications such as astronomy and data mining. The latest minor release is 6.40.04, as of 2026-08-27.

== Description ==
CERN maintained the CERN Program Library written in FORTRAN for many years. Its development and maintenance were discontinued in 2003 in favour of ROOT, which is written in the C++ programming language. ROOT development was initiated by René Brun and Fons Rademakers in 1994. Some parts are published under the GNU Lesser General Public License (LGPL) and others are based on GNU General Public License (GPL) software, and are thus also published under the terms of the GPL. It provides platform independent access to a computer's graphics subsystem and operating system using abstract layers. Parts of the abstract platform are: a graphical user interface and a GUI builder, container classes, reflection, a C++ script and command line interpreter (CINT in version 5, cling in version 6), object serialization and persistence.

The packages provided by ROOT include those for

- Histogramming and graphing to view and analyze distributions and functions,
- curve fitting (regression analysis) and minimization of functionals,
- statistics tools used for data analysis,
- matrix algebra,
- four-vector computations, as used in high energy physics,
- standard mathematical functions,
- multivariate data analysis, e.g. using neural networks,
- image manipulation, used, for instance, to analyze astronomical pictures,
- access to distributed data (in the context of the Grid),
- distributed computing, to parallelize data analyses,
- persistence and serialization of objects, which can cope with changes in class definitions of persistent data,
- access to databases,
- 3D visualizations (geometry),
- creating files in various graphics formats, like PDF, PostScript, PNG, SVG, LaTeX, etc.
- interfacing Python code in both directions,
- interfacing Monte Carlo event generators.

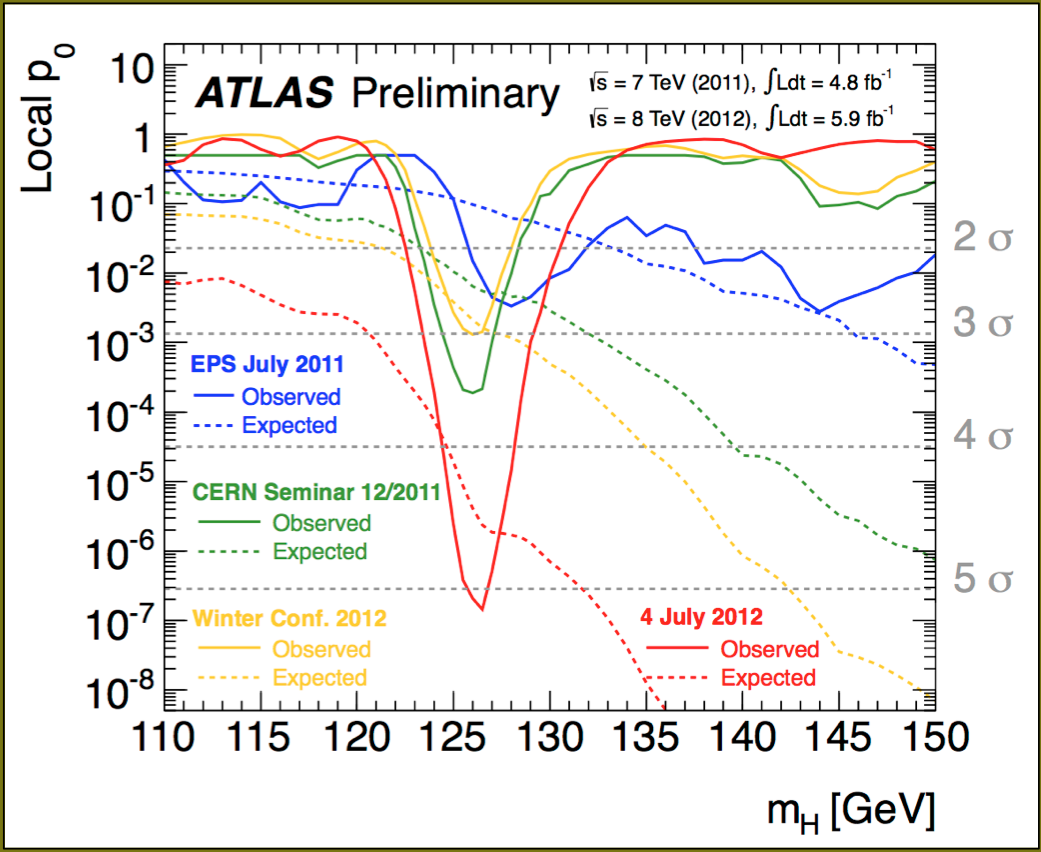
The ATLAS experiments presented on 4 July 2012 the status of the Standard Model Higgs search. All the plots presented that day were created in ROOT.

A key feature of ROOT is a data container called tree, with its substructures branches and leaves. A tree can be seen as a sliding window to the raw data, as stored in a file. Data from the next entry in the file can be retrieved by advancing the index in the tree. This avoids memory allocation problems associated with object creation, and allows the tree to act as a lightweight container while handling buffering invisibly.

ROOT is designed for high computing efficiency, as it is required to process data from the Large Hadron Collider's experiments estimated at several petabytes per year. As of 2009 ROOT is mainly used in data analysis and data acquisition in particle physics (high energy physics) experiments, and most current experimental plots and results in those subfields are obtained using ROOT.

The inclusion of a C++ interpreter (CINT until version 5.34, Cling from version 6.00) makes this package very versatile as it can be used in interactive, scripted and compiled modes in a manner similar to commercial products like MATLAB.

On July 4, 2012, the ATLAS and CMS LHC's experiments presented the status of the Standard Model Higgs search. All data plotting presented that day used ROOT.

== Applications ==
Several particle physics collaborations have written software based on ROOT, often in favor of using more generic solutions (e.g. using ROOT containers instead of STL).

- Some of the running particle physics experiments using software based on ROOT
  - ALICE
  - ATLAS
  - BaBar experiment
  - Belle Experiment (an electron positron collider at KEK (Japan))
  - Belle II experiment (successor of the Belle experiment)
  - BES III
  - CB-ELSA/TAPS
  - CMS
  - COMPASS experiment (Common Muon and Proton Apparatus for Structure and Spectroscopy)
  - CUORE (Cryogenic Underground Observatory for Rare Events)
  - D0 experiment
  - GlueX Experiment
  - GRAPES-3 (Gamma Ray Astronomy PeV EnergieS)
  - H1 (particle detector) at HERA collider at DESY, Hamburg
  - LHCb
  - MINERνA (Main Injector Experiment for ν-A)
  - MINOS (Main injector neutrino oscillation search)
  - NA61 experiment (SPS Heavy Ion and Neutrino Experiment)
  - NOνA
  - OPERA experiment
  - PHENIX detector
  - PHOBOS experiment at Relativistic Heavy Ion Collider
  - SNO+
  - STAR detector (Solenoidal Tracker at RHIC)
  - T2K experiment
- Future particle physics experiments currently developing software based on ROOT
  - Mu2e
  - Compressed Baryonic Matter experiment (CBM)
  - PANDA experiment (antiProton Annihilation at Darmstadt (PANDA))
  - Deep Underground Neutrino Experiment (DUNE)
  - Hyper-Kamiokande (HK (Japan))
- Astrophysics (X-ray and gamma-ray astronomy, astroparticle physics) projects using ROOT
  - AGILE
  - Alpha Magnetic Spectrometer (AMS)
  - Antarctic Impulse Transient Antenna (ANITA)
  - ANTARES neutrino detector
  - CRESST (Dark Matter Search)
  - DMTPC
  - DEAP-3600/Cryogenic Low-Energy Astrophysics with Neon(CLEAN)
  - Fermi Gamma-ray Space Telescope
  - ICECUBE
  - HAWC
  - High Energy Stereoscopic System (H.E.S.S.)
  - Hitomi (ASTRO-H)
  - MAGIC
  - Milagro
  - Pierre Auger Observatory
  - VERITAS
  - PAMELA
  - POLAR
  - PoGOLite

== Criticisms ==
Criticisms of ROOT include its difficulty for beginners, as well as various aspects of its design and implementation. Frequent causes of frustration include extreme code bloat, heavy use of global variables, and an overcomplicated class hierarchy. From time to time these issues are discussed on the ROOT users mailing list. While scientists dissatisfied with ROOT have in the past managed to work around its flaws, some of the shortcomings are regularly addressed by the ROOT team. The CINT interpreter, for example, has been replaced by the Cling interpreter, and numerous bugs are fixed with every release.

== See also ==
- Matplotlib – a plotting and analysis system for Python
- SciPy – a scientific data analysis system for Python, based on the NumPy classes
- Perl Data Language – a set of array programming extensions to the Perl programming language
- HippoDraw – an alternative C++-based data analysis system
- R programming language
- AIDA (computing) – open interfaces and formats for particle physics data processing
- Geant4 – a platform for the simulation of the passage of particles through matter using Monte Carlo methods
- PAW
- IGOR Pro
- Scientific Linux
- Scientific computing
- OpenDX
- OpenScientist
- CERN Program Library – legacy program library written in Fortran77, still available but not updated
