= GEANT-3 =

Monte carlo simulation software

GEANT is the name of a series of simulation software designed to describe the passage of elementary particles through matter, using Monte Carlo methods. The name is an acronym formed from "GEometry ANd Tracking". Originally developed at CERN for high energy physics experiments, GEANT-3 has been used in many other fields.

== History ==
The very first version of GEANT dates back to 1974, while the first version of GEANT-3 dates back to 1982. Versions of GEANT through 3.21 were written in FORTRAN and eventually maintained as part of CERNLIB. Since about 2000, the last FORTRAN release has been essentially in stasis and receives only occasional bug fixes. GEANT3 was, however, still in use by some experiments for some time thereafter. Most of GEANT-3 is available under the GNU General Public License, with the exception of some hadronic interaction code contributed by the FLUKA collaboration.

GEANT-3 was used by a majority of high energy physics experiments from the late 1980s to the early 2000s. The largest experiments using were three of the experiments at the Large Electron-Positron collider, including ALEPH, L3 and OPAL. It was also a key tool in the design and optimization of the detectors of all experiments at the Large Hadron Collider (LHC) – see e.g. the ATLAS Technical Design Report. GEANT-3.21 based programs remained main simulation engine of ATLAS, CMS and LHCb at LHC until 2004, when these experiments moved to Geant4-based simulations. Even in 2019 it remains the primary simulation tool for the ALICE experiment at the LHC.

A related (but separate) product is Geant4 (when referring to this version, the name is typically no longer capitalized). It is a complete rewrite in C++ with a modern object-oriented design. Geant4 was developed by the RD44 collaboration in 1994–1998 and is being maintained and improved now by the Geant4 international collaboration. For quite some time Geant4 did not have a clearly defined software license. As of version 8.1 (released June 30, 2006) this omission has been remedied. Geant4 is now available under the Geant4 Software License.

== See also ==
- EGS (program)
- CLHEP and FreeHEP, libraries for high energy physics
