= HippoDraw =

Statistical data analysis package

- Developer: Paul F. Kunz
- Stable release: 1.21.3 / October 2007; 18 years ago
- Written in: C++
- Operating system: Cross-platform
- Type: Data analysis
- License: GPLv2+
- Website: www.slac.stanford.edu/grp/ek/hippodraw/

HippoDraw is a object-oriented statistical data analysis package written in C++, with user interaction via a Qt-based GUI and a Python-scriptable interface. It was developed by Paul Kunz at SLAC, primarily for the analysis and presentation of particle physics and astrophysics data, but can be equally well used in other fields where data handling is important.

== About ==
HippoDraw can read and write files in an XML-based format, astrophysics FITS files, data objects produced by ROOT (optional), and through the Python bindings, anything that can be read/written by Python (HDF5, for instance, with PyTables).

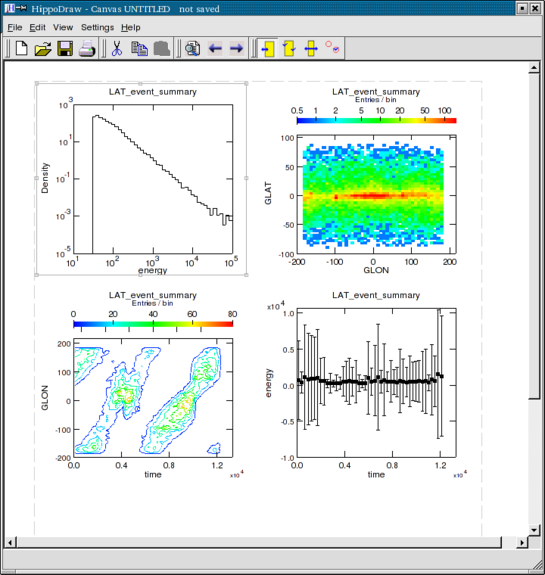
Screenshot

HippoDraw can be used as a Python extension module, allowing users to use HippoDraw data objects with the full power of the Python language. This includes other scientific Python extension modules such Numeric and numarray, whose use with HippoDraw can lead to a large increase in processing speed, even for ROOT objects.

== See also ==
- ROOT
- AIDA
