= CERN Program Library =

Legacy scientific programming software collection by CERN

- Developer(s): CERN
- Stable release: 2023.08.14; 1 year ago / August 14, 2023; 19 months ago
- Repository: cernlib.web.cern.ch/cernlib/
- Operating system: Cross-platform
- Type: Technical computing
- License: GNU General Public License, except for GEANT
- Website: cern.ch/cernlib

The CERN Program Library (CERNLIB) is a collection of general purpose software libraries and program modules for scientific computing, developed at the European Organization for Nuclear Research CERN. The application area of the library focuses on physics research, in particular high energy physics, involving general mathematics, data analysis, detectors simulation, data-handling, numerical analysis, and others, applicable to a wide range of scientific problems. Many modules are written in the FORTRAN 77 language.

The major fields covered by the libraries contained therein were:

- Elementary particle data
- Graphics and plotting
- Histograming
- I/O and structured data storage
- Numerical analysis
- Statistics and data analysis
- Detector simulation and Hadronic event generation

Lower-level parts of the CERN Program Library were most prominently used by the data analysis software Physics Analysis Workstation (PAW) and the detector simulation framework GEANT, both of which are also part of the CERN Program Library.

CERN Program Library used the year as its version, with not explicitly denoted minor revisions within a year. Besides legacy software dependency, for newer applications written in C++, CERNLIB is superseded by ROOT.

== Status ==
Development and support for CERNLIB was discontinued in 2003. Libraries were still available "as is" "for ever" from the CERNLIB web site but with no new code, no user support and no port to IA-64.

The code was revitalized in 2022, multiple patches were added and as of 2023 the code can be compiled on multiple architectures either with its native build system imake or with the CMake. The revitalized version is based on the CERNLIB release 2006.
