= Physics Analysis Workstation =

Data analysis tool used at CERN

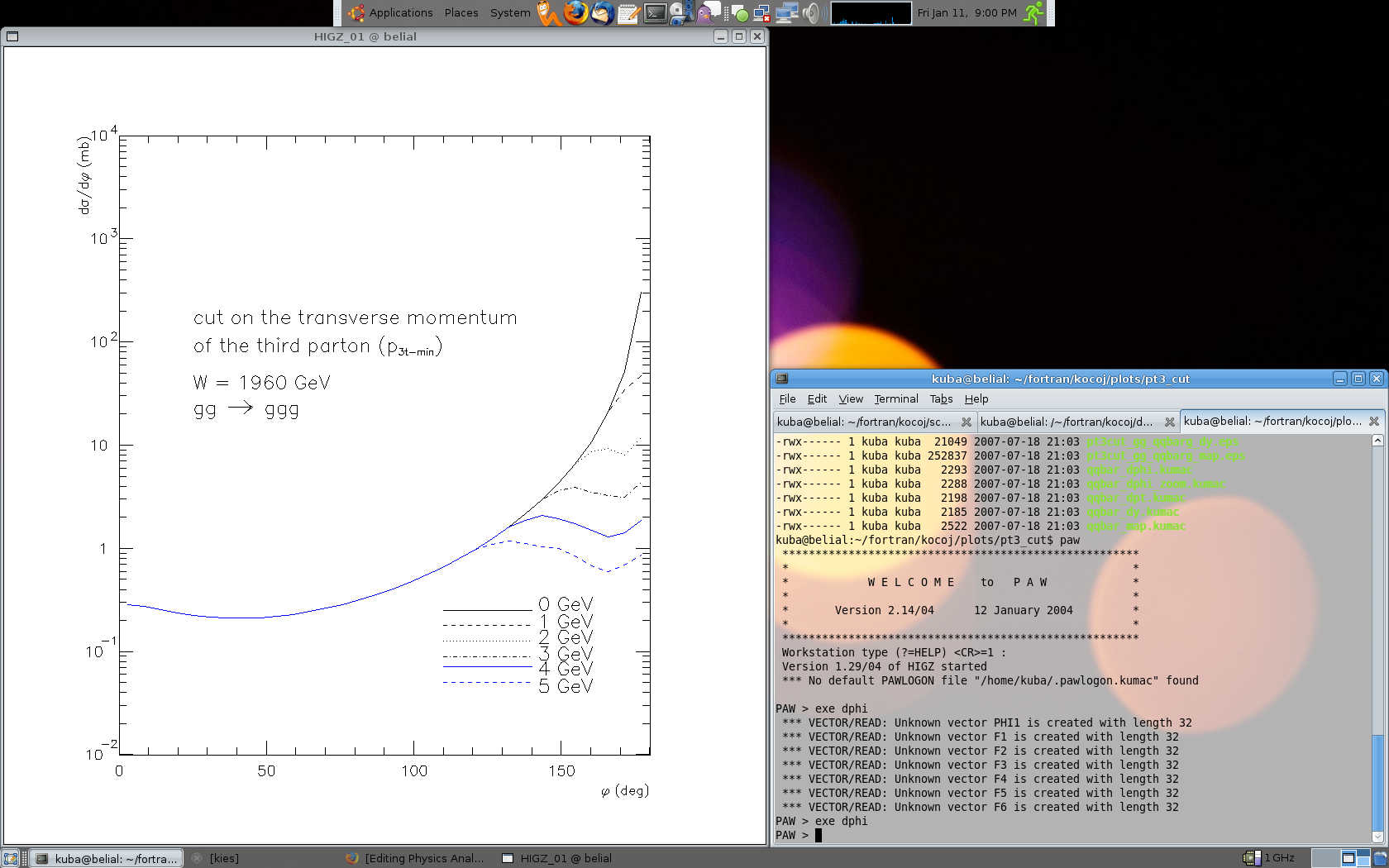
- PAW - sample code output
- Original author: CERN
- Initial release: 1986; 39 years ago
- Stable release: 2.13/08 / September 16, 2002; 23 years ago
- Type: Particle physics
- License: GNU GPL
- Website: cern.ch/paw/

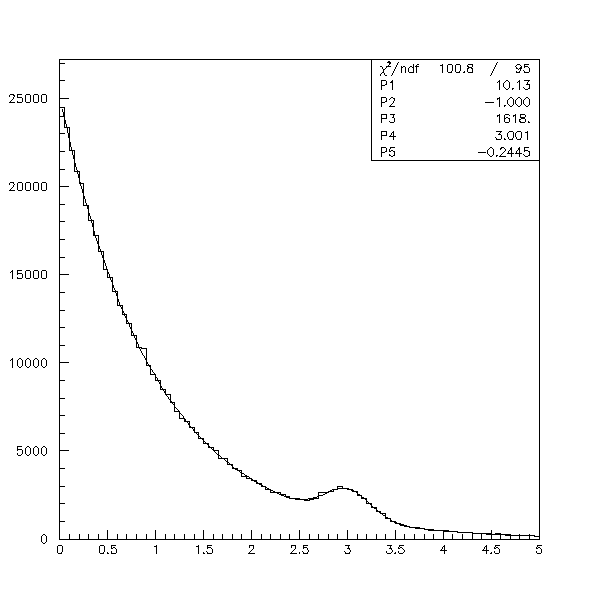
PAW screen capture

The Physics Analysis Workstation (PAW) is an interactive, scriptable computer software tool for data analysis and graphical presentation in high-energy physics.

The development of this software tool started at CERN in 1986, it was optimized for the processing of very large amounts of data. It was based on and intended for inter-operation with components of CERNLIB, an extensive collection of Fortran libraries.

PAW had been a standard tool in high energy physics for decades, yet was essentially unmaintained. Despite continuing popularity as of 2008, it has been losing ground to the C++-based ROOT package. Conversion tutorials exist. In 2014, development and support were stopped.

== Sample script ==
PAW uses its own scripting language. Here is sample code (with its actual output), which can be used to plot data gathered in files.

* read data
vector/read X,Y input_file.dat

* eps plot

fort/file 55 gg_ggg_dsig_dphid_179181.eps
meta 55 -113

opt linx   | linear scale
opt logy   | logarithmic scale

* here goes plot

set plci 1       | line color
set lwid 2       | line width
set dmod 1       | line type (solid, dotted, etc.)
graph 32 X Y AL   | 32 stands for input data lines in input file

* plot title and comments

set txci 1
atitle '[f] (deg)' 'd[s]/d[f]! (mb)'

set txci 1
text 180.0 2e1 '[f]=179...181 deg' 0.12

close 55
