= Nepheloscope =

A nephelescope is a device invented by James Pollard Espy to measure the drop in temperature of a gas from a reduction in pressure; originally used to explore the formation of clouds.

== Original design ==
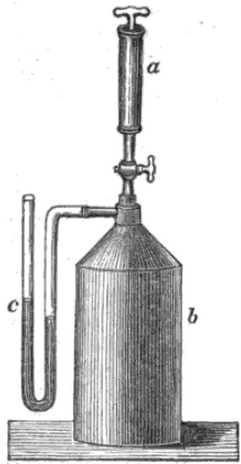
Original design of the nepheloscope

The original design consisted of an air compression pump (a), a vessel (b), and a barometer (c).

Air is pumped into the vessel until a desired pressure is reached, the stopclock is then closed and the temperature allowed to equilibriate. The stopclock is then opened, allowing the pressure of the container to equilibriate the atmosphere, and then closed again.

The air inside of the container would now be colder. As it warms up, pressure inside the container once again increases above atmosphere. This increase in pressure can be used to work out the number of degrees which the container had been cooled by.

== Later developments ==
Later design

A later design consisted of an air pump receiver (a) connected to a flask (c) by an intervening stopclock (b). Air was pumped out of the receiver, then the stopclock was opened. One advantage of using negative pressure was that a glass vessel could be used, which allowed the observation of condensation and droplets resulting from the drop in temperature. To observe this in a dry atmosphere, air would have needed to first be moistened by exposure to water.

== Historical significance ==
The nephelescope enabled Espy to predict the change in heat of air as water vapor became cloud. He showed that when dry air was used instead of moist air, temperature was reduced by about twice as much as moist air. In other words, latent heat released from the condensation of water mitigated some of the cooling from expansion of moist air. Since moist air is already lighter than dry air, the warmer and lighter moist air in clouds would continue to rise and cool, forcing more vapor to condense, which had consequences for meteorological theories at that time.

The nephelescope has been described as an "early cloud-chamber".
