= CINT =

C/C++ interpreter

CINT is a command line C/C++ interpreter that was originally included in the object-oriented data analysis package ROOT. Although intended for use with the other faculties of ROOT, CINT can also be used as a standalone addition to another program that requires such an interpreter. In 2013, CERN switched to the Cling C++ interpreter, so CINT is now distributed standalone by the author.

CINT is an interpreted version of C/C++, much in the way BeanShell is an interpreted version of Java. In addition to being a language interpreter, it offers certain Bash-like shell features such as history and tab-completion. To accomplish the latter, it relies heavily on the reflection support built into ROOT. User classes that follow these interfaces may also take advantage of these features.

The language originally interpreted by CINT was actually something of a hybrid between C and C++, covering about 95% of ANSI C and 85% of C++. The syntax, however, is a bit more forgiving than either language. For example, the operator -> can be replaced by . with only an optional warning. In addition, statements on the command line do not need to end with a semi-colon, although this is necessary for statements in macros.

As an alternative to CINT, ROOT also provides Cling which is an REPL application using LLVM's Clang as a C++ JIT compilation environment. This effort is being upstreamed into clang-repl.

== See also ==
- C/C++ Interpreter Ch
