= Paul Kunz =

American particle physicist and software developer (1942–2018)

Paul Kunze
- Born: December 20, 1942
- Died: September 12, 2018 (aged 75)
- Education: Princeton University (PhD)
- Occupations: Particle physicist and software developer
- Years active: 35 years
- Employer: SLAC
- Organization: Stanford Linear Accelerator Center (SLAC)
- Known for: The first active Web server deployed outside of Europe; GNUstep implementation of the NeXTSTEP framework, and objcX idea.
- Notable work: HippoDraw statistical analysis software; parallel computing on the first server farms installed near particle accelerators (SLAC and CERN).

Paul Kunz (December 20, 1942 – September 12, 2018) was an American particle physicist and software developer, who initiated the deployment of the first web server outside of Europe. After a meeting in September 1991 with Tim Berners-Lee of CERN, he returned to the Stanford Linear Accelerator Center (SLAC) with word of the World Wide Web. By Thursday, December 12, 1991, there was an active Web server installed and operational at SLAC, establishing the first Web server in the US, the SPIRES HEP, connected to the SPIRES High Energy Physics database, thanks to the efforts of Kunz, Louise Addis, and Terry Hung.

He was also the originator of the free/open source GNUstep implementation of the NeXTSTEP framework and also at the basis of the idea for objcX (objective-C for the X Window System). He was the chief developer of HippoDraw, a statistical analysis software, primarily intended for the analysis and presentation of particle physics and astrophysics data at SLAC.
