= OpenScientist =

- Developer(s): Guy Barrand
- Stable release: 16.8 / December 2008
- Repository: softinex.lal.in2p3.fr/OpenScientist/16.11.8_1/html/build.html
- Operating system: Cross-platform
- Type: Data analysis
- License: LGPL/GPL
- Website: openscientist.lal.in2p3.fr

OpenScientist is an integration of open source products working together to do scientific visualization and data analysis, in particular for high energy physics (HEP).

Among other things, it contains a light C++ AIDA implementation that can be used to run the histogramming part of Geant4 examples.
