= CLHEP =

C++ library

CLHEP (short for A Class Library for High Energy Physics) is a C++ library that provides utility classes for general numerical programming, vector arithmetic, geometry, pseudorandom number generation, and linear algebra, specifically targeted for high energy physics simulation and analysis software. The project is hosted by CERN and currently managed by a collaboration of researchers from CERN and other physics research laboratories and academic institutions. According to the project's website, CLHEP is in maintenance mode (accepting bug fixes but no further development is expected).

CLHEP was proposed by Swedish physicist Leif Lönnblad in 1992 at a Conference on Computing in High-Energy Physics. Lönnblad is still involved in maintaining CLHEP. The project has more recently accepted contributions from other projects built on top of CLHEP, including the physics packages Geant4 and ZOOM, and the BaBar experiment at SLAC.

== See also ==
- Geant4, a software using CLHEP
- FreeHEP, a similar library to CLHEP
- COLT, a Java package for High Performance Scientific and Technical Computing, provided by CERN.
