= Geant4 =

Scientific software for particle physics

- Developer: Geant4 Collaboration
- Initial release: 1998; 27 years ago
- Stable release: 11.4.0 / December 5, 2025; 0 days ago
- Repository: gitlab.cern.ch:7999/geant4/geant4.git
- Operating system: Cross-platform
- Type: Computational physics
- License: Geant4 Software License
- Website: geant4.org

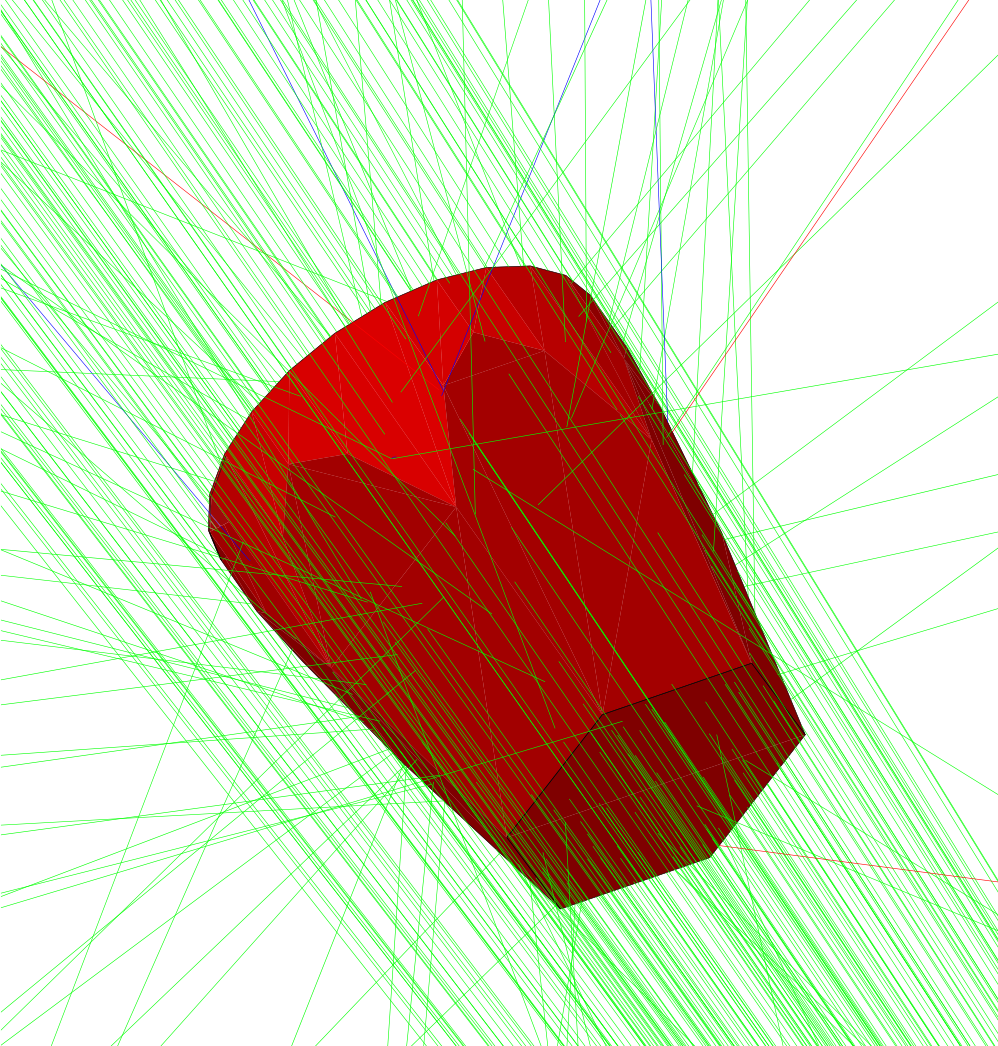
Visualisation of a simulation. The detector is red and radiation is green.

Geant4 (for GEometry ANd Tracking) is a platform for "the simulation of the passage of particles through matter" using Monte Carlo methods. It is the successor of the GEANT series of software toolkits developed by The Geant4 Collaboration, and the first to use object oriented programming (in C++). Its development, maintenance and user support are taken care by the international Geant4 Collaboration. Application areas include high energy physics and nuclear experiments, accelerator and space physics studies. The software is used by a number of research projects around the world.

The Geant4 software and source code is freely available from the project web site; until version 8.1 (released June 28, 2006), no specific software license for its use existed; Geant4 is now provided under the Geant4 Software License.

== Features ==
Geant4 includes facilities for handling geometry, tracking, detector response, run management, visualization and user interface. For many physics simulations, this means less time needs to be spent on the low level details, and researchers can start immediately on the more important aspects of the simulation.

Following is a summary of each of the facilities listed above:

- Geometry is an analysis of the physical layout of the experiment, including detectors, absorbers, etc., and considering how this layout will affect the path of particles in the experiment.
- Tracking is simulating the passage of a particle through matter. This involves considering possible interactions and decay processes.
- Detector response is recording when a particle passes through the volume of a detector, and approximating how a real detector would respond.
- Run management is recording the details of each run (a set of events), as well as setting up the experiment in different configurations between runs.
- Geant4 offers a number of options for visualization, including OpenGL, Open Inventor, VRML or VTK and a familiar user interface, based on tcsh or Qt.

Geant4 can also perform basic histogramming; it requires external analysis tools for exploiting advanced histogramming features.

Since release 10.0, Geant4 implements multithreading, making use of thread-local storage to allow for efficient generation of simulated events in parallel. Geant4 can be installed under a Unix-based operating system such as MacOS, Linux or under Microsoft Windows.

== Some high energy physics experiments using Geant4 ==
- BES III at BEPCII
- BaBar and GLAST at SLAC
- ATLAS, CMS and LHCb at LHC, CERN
- COMPASS at SPS, CERN
- Borexino at Gran Sasso Laboratory
- DUNE, MINOS, Muon g-2, MicroBooNE/MiniBooNE, and Mu2e at Fermilab
- Enriched Xenon Observatory (EXO)
- SNO+
- IceCube
- T2K
- CUORE
- Dark Matter Detectors: SuperCDMS, LUX, LZ, XENON

== Applications outside high energy physics ==
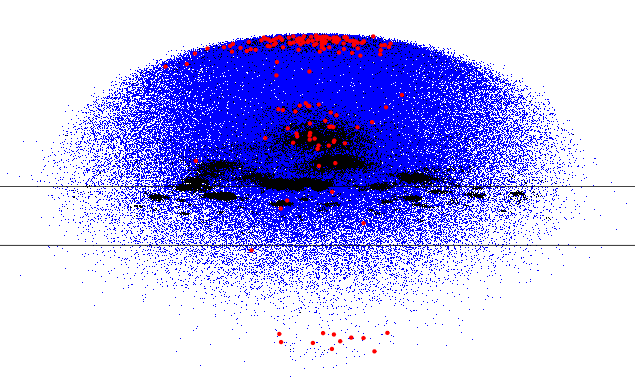
GEANT4 simulation of relativistic electron avalanche driven by an electric field in air as might occur in thunderstorms and lightning.

Because of its general purpose nature, Geant4 is well suited for development of computational tools for analysing interactions of particle with matter in many areas. These include:

- Space applications where it is used to study interactions between the natural space radiation environment and space hardware or astronauts;
- Radiation effects in microelectronics where ionizing effects on semiconductor devices are modeled.
- Nuclear physics

== See also ==
- CLHEP and FreeHEP, libraries for high energy physics.
- Accelerator physics codes for the modeling of charged particles in the rest of an accelerator.
