= Johansen test =

Time series statistical test

In statistics, the Johansen test, named after Søren Johansen, is a procedure for testing cointegration of several, say k, I(1) time series. This test permits more than one cointegrating relationship so is more generally applicable than the Engle-Granger test which is based on the Dickey–Fuller (or the augmented) test for unit roots in the residuals from a single (estimated) cointegrating relationship.

== Types ==
There are two types of Johansen test, either with trace or with eigenvalue, and the inferences might be a little bit different. The null hypothesis for the trace test is that the number of cointegration vectors is r = r* < k, vs. the alternative that r = k. Testing proceeds sequentially for r* = 1,2, etc. and the first non-rejection of the null is taken as an estimate of r. The null hypothesis for the "maximum eigenvalue" test is as for the trace test but the alternative is r = r* + 1 and, again, testing proceeds sequentially for r* = 1,2,etc., with the first non-rejection used as an estimator for r.

Just like a unit root test, there can be a constant term, a trend term, both, or neither in the model. For a general VAR(p) model:

$$X_t=\mu+\Phi D_t+\Pi_p X_{t-p}+\cdots+\Pi_1 X_{t-1}+e_t,\quad t=1,\dots,T$$

There are two possible specifications for error correction: that is, two vector error correction models (VECM):

1. The longrun VECM:

$$\Delta X_t =\mu+\Phi D_{t}+\Pi X_{t-p}+\Gamma_{p-1}\Delta X_{t-p+1}+\cdots+\Gamma_{1}\Delta X_{t-1}+\varepsilon_t,\quad t=1,\dots,T$$

where

$$\Gamma_i = \Pi_1 + \cdots + \Pi_i - I,\quad i=1,\dots,p-1. \,$$

2. The transitory VECM:

$$\Delta X_{t}=\mu+\Phi  D_{t}+\Pi X_{t-1}-\sum_{j=1}^{p-1}\Gamma_{j}\Delta X_{t-j}+\varepsilon_{t},\quad t=1,\cdots,T$$

where

$$\Gamma_i = \left(\Pi_{i+1}+\cdots+\Pi_p\right),\quad i=1,\dots,p-1. \,$$

The two are the same. In both VECM,

$$\Pi=\Pi_{1}+\cdots+\Pi_{p}-I. \,$$

Inferences are drawn on Π, and they will be the same, so is the explanatory power.
