= Error correction model =

Type of time series model

An error correction model (ECM) is a type of time series model commonly applied when the underlying variables share a long-run stochastic trend, a property known as cointegration. ECMs provide a theoretically grounded framework for estimating both short-run dynamics and long-run relationships among variables.

The term error correction refers to the idea that deviations from the long-run equilibrium (the error) affect short-run adjustments. In this framework, the model directly estimates the speed at which a dependent variable returns to equilibrium following changes in other explanatory variables.

== History ==
Yule (1926) and Granger and Newbold (1974) were the first to draw attention to the problem of spurious correlation and find solutions on how to address it in time series analysis. Given two completely unrelated but integrated (non-stationary) time series, the regression analysis of one on the other will tend to produce an apparently statistically significant relationship and thus a researcher might falsely believe to have found evidence of a true relationship between these variables. Ordinary least squares will no longer be consistent and commonly used test-statistics will be non-valid. In particular, Monte Carlo simulations show that one will get a very high R squared, very high individual t-statistic and a low Durbin–Watson statistic. Technically speaking, Phillips (1986) proved that parameter estimates will not converge in probability, the intercept will diverge and the slope will have a non-degenerate distribution as the sample size increases. However, there might be a common stochastic trend to both series that a researcher is genuinely interested in because it reflects a long-run relationship between these variables.

Because of the stochastic nature of the trend it is not possible to break up integrated series into a deterministic (predictable) trend and a stationary series containing deviations from trend. Even in deterministically detrended random walks spurious correlations will eventually emerge. Thus detrending does not solve the estimation problem.

In order to still use the Box–Jenkins approach, one could difference the series and then estimate models such as ARIMA, given that many commonly used time series (e.g. in economics) appear to be stationary in first differences. Forecasts from such a model will still reflect cycles and seasonality that are present in the data. However, any information about long-run adjustments that the data in levels may contain is omitted and longer term forecasts will be unreliable.

This led Sargan (1964) to develop the ECM methodology, which retains the level information.

== Estimation ==
Several methods are known in the literature for estimating a refined dynamic model as described above. Among these are the Engle and Granger 2-step approach, estimating their ECM in one step and the vector-based VECM using Johansen's method.

=== Engle and Granger 2-step approach ===
The first step of this method is to pre-test the individual time series used, to confirm that they are non-stationary in the first place. This can be done by standard unit root DF testing and ADF test (to resolve the problem of serially correlated errors). Take the case of two different series $x_t$ and $y_t$. If both are I(0), standard regression analysis will be valid. If they are integrated of a different order, e.g. one being I(1) and the other being I(0), we have to transform the model.

If they are both integrated to the same order (commonly I(1)), we can estimate an ECM model of the form

$$A(L) \, \Delta y_t = \gamma + B(L) \, \Delta x_t + \alpha (y_{t-1} -\beta_0 - \beta_1 x_{t-1} ) + \nu_t.$$

[define A and B]

If both variables are integrated and this ECM exists, they are cointegrated by the Engle–Granger representation theorem.

The second step is then to estimate the model using ordinary least squares: $y_t = \beta_0 + \beta_1 x_t + \varepsilon_t$ If the regression is not spurious as determined by test criteria described above, Ordinary least squares will not only be valid, but also consistent (Stock, 1987). Then the predicted residuals $\hat{\varepsilon_t}= y_t -\beta_0 - \beta_1 x_t$ from this regression are saved and used in a regression of differenced variables plus a lagged error term

$$A(L) \, \Delta y_t = \gamma + B(L) \, \Delta x_t + \alpha \hat{\varepsilon}_{t-1} + \nu_t.$$

We can then test for cointegration using a standard t-statistic on $\alpha$. While this approach is easy to apply, there are numerous problems:

- The univariate unit root tests used in the first stage have low statistical power
- The choice of dependent variable in the first stage influences test results, that is we need $x_t$ to be weakly exogenous
- We can potentially have a small sample bias
- The cointegration test on $\alpha$ does not follow a standard distribution
- The validity of the long-run parameters in the first regression stage where we obtain the residuals cannot be verified because the distribution of the OLS estimator of the cointegrating vector is highly complicated and non-normal
- At most one cointegrating relationship can be examined.

=== VECM ===
The Engle–Granger approach as described above suffers from a number of weaknesses. Namely it is restricted to only a single equation with one variable designated as the dependent variable, explained by another variable that is assumed to be weakly exogeneous for the parameters of interest. It also relies on pretesting the time series to find out whether variables are I(0) or I(1). These weaknesses can be addressed through the use of Johansen's procedure. Its advantages include that pretesting is not necessary, there can be numerous cointegrating relationships, all variables are treated as endogenous and tests relating to the long-run parameters are possible. The resulting model is known as a vector error correction model (VECM), as it adds error correction features to a multi-factor model known as vector autoregression (VAR). The procedure is done as follows:

- Step 1: estimate an unrestricted VAR involving potentially non-stationary variables
- Step 2: Test for cointegration using Johansen test
- Step 3: Form and analyse the VECM.

=== An example of ECM ===
The idea of cointegration may be demonstrated in a simple macroeconomic setting. Suppose, consumption $C_t$ and disposable income $Y_t$ are macroeconomic time series that are related in the long run (see Permanent income hypothesis). Specifically, let average propensity to consume be 90%, that is, in the long run $C_t = 0.9 Y_t$. From the econometrician's point of view, this long run relationship (aka cointegration) exists if errors from the regression $C_t = \beta Y_t+\varepsilon_t$ are a stationary series, although $Y_t$ and $C_t$ are non-stationary. Suppose also that if $Y_t$ suddenly changes by $\Delta Y_t$, then $C_t$ changes by $\Delta C_t = 0.5 \, \Delta Y_t$, that is, marginal propensity to consume equals 50%. Our final assumption is that the gap between current and equilibrium consumption decreases each period by 20%.

In this setting a change $\Delta C_t = C_t - C_{t-1}$ in consumption level can be modelled as $\Delta C_t = 0.5 \, \Delta Y_t - 0.2 (C_{t-1}-0.9 Y_{t-1}) +\varepsilon_t$. The first term in the RHS describes short-run impact of change in $Y_t$ on $C_t$, the second term explains long-run gravitation towards the equilibrium relationship between the variables, and the third term reflects random shocks that the system receives (e.g. shocks of consumer confidence that affect consumption). To see how the model works, consider two kinds of shocks: permanent and transitory (temporary). For simplicity, let $\varepsilon_t$ be zero for all t. Suppose in period t − 1 the system is in equilibrium, i.e. $C_{t-1} = 0.9 Y_{t-1}$. Suppose that in the period t, disposable income $Y_t$ increases by 10 and then returns to its previous level. Then $C_t$ first (in period t) increases by 5 (half of 10), but after the second period $C_t$ begins to decrease and converges to its initial level. In contrast, if the shock to $Y_t$ is permanent, then $C_t$ slowly converges to a value that exceeds the initial $C_{t-1}$ by 9.

This structure is common to all ECM models. In practice, econometricians often first estimate the cointegration relationship (equation in levels), and then insert it into the main model (equation in differences).
