= Yongcheol Shin =

British economist

- Born: 24 December 1960 (age 65); South Korea

Academic background
- Education: Michigan State University
- Doctoral advisor: Peter Schmidt

Academic work
- Institutions: University of York
- Website: Information at IDEAS / RePEc

Yongcheol Shin (Korean: 신용철, born 24 December 1960) is a British economist at the University of York. He has previously held positions at leading academic institutions such as University of Cambridge, University of Edinburgh and University of Leeds. His notable contributions to econometrics include asymmetric autoregressive distributed lag model, unit root tests in ESTAR framework, and the long-run structural VAR modelling approach.

== Education and career ==
Yongcheol Shin received his bachelor's degree in English Literature in 1983 and Master's in Economics at the Hankuk University of Foreign Studies, South Korea in 1985. He received his PhD in economics from Michigan State University in 1992. Currently, Shin is a professor at the Department of Economics and Related Studies at the University of York. Before he has worked as professor at the Department of Economics at the Leeds University Business School (University of Leeds) for seven years.

Previously, he has worked as Senior Research Officer from 1995 to 1998 and Research Officer at the Department of Applied Economics, University of Cambridge. In 1995–1996, Shin served as short term consultant at the International Economics Department of the World Bank and at the Citibank International plc. London. He was a visiting professor at the SungKunKwan University, Seoul, and Wits University, Johannesburg. From 1995 to 1997, he worked on the econometric software project, Working with Microfit, at the Cambridge University as hands-on session supervisions.

Shin has served as reader from 2000 to 2004 and a lecturer at the University of Edinburgh School of Economics from 1998 to 2000. He was a professor at the Economics Division at the University of Leeds from 2004 to 2011.

== Academic merits ==
Shin has published and written more than 46 articles in leading scientific journals in the areas of econometrics, macroeconomics, asset pricing and empirical finance. His contribution to the ARDL model for the cointegration analysis with Mohammad Hashem Pesaran was introduced in the Cambridge University book, "Econometrics and Economic Theory in the 20th Century" (Ed. Steinar Strøm).

He was awarded Best Paper Award 2002–2004 by Econometric Reviews with Pesaran in 2005 for their research paper Long Run Structural Modelling.

== Publications ==
- Greenwood-Nimmo, M.J.; Shin, Y.; and Van Treeck, T., The Asymmetric ARDL Model with Multiple Unknown Threshold Decompositions: An Application to the Phillips Curve in Canada. Working Paper Series, The Leeds University Business School, 2011
- Serlenga, L.; Shin, Y., Gravity models of intra-EU trade: application of the CCEP-HT estimation in heterogeneous panels with unobserved common time-specific factors, Journal of Applied Econometrics, 22 (2), pp361–381, 2007
- Shin, Y; Snell, A, Mean group tests for stationarity in heterogeneous panels, Econometrics Journal, 9(1), pp123–158, 2006
- Shin, Y; Snell, A, Mean Group Tests for Stationarity in Heterogeneous Panels The Econometrics Journal, 2006
- Shin, Y; Kapetanios, G; Snell, A, Testing for Cointegration in Nonlinear Smooth Transition Error Correction Models Econometric Theory, 22, pp79–303, 2006
- Garratt, A; Lee, K; Pesaran, MH; Shin, Y, A Long Run Structural Macroeconometric Model of the UK Economic Journal, 113(4), pp412–455, 2003
- Garratt, A; Lee, K; Pesaran, MH; Shin, Y, Forecast Uncertainties in Macroeconomic Modeling: An Application to the UK Economy Journal of the American Statistical Association, 98(464), pp829–838, 2003
- Im, KS; Pesaran, MH; Shin, Y, Testing for unit roots in heterogeneous panels Journal of Econometrics, 115(1), pp53–74, 2003
- Pesaran, MH; Shin, Y, Long-Run Structural Modelling Econometric Reviews, pp49–87, 2002
- Chortareas, G; Kapetanios, G; Shin, Y, Nonlinear Mean-reversion in Real Exchange Rates Economics Letters, pp411–417, 2002
- Kapetanios, G; Shin, Y; Snell, S, Testing for a unit root in the nonlinear STAR framework Journal of Econometrics, 112(2), pp359–379, 2002
- Serlenga, L.; Shin, Y.; and Snell, A., A Panel Data Approach to Testing Anomaly Effects in Factor Pricing Models. Royal Economic Society Annual Conference 2002 165, Royal Economic Society.
- Pesaran, MH; Shin, Y; Smith, RJ, Bounds testing approaches to the analysis of level relationships Journal of Applied Econometrics, 16(3), pp289–326, 2001

== See also ==
- KPSS test
