= Stochastic drift =

Term in proability theory

In probability theory, stochastic drift is the change of the average value of a stochastic (random) process. A related concept is the drift rate, which is the rate at which the average changes. For example, a process that counts the number of heads in a series of $n$ fair coin tosses has a drift rate of 1/2 per toss. This is in contrast to the random fluctuations about this average value. The stochastic mean of that coin-toss process is 1/2 and the drift rate of the stochastic mean is 0, assuming 1 = heads and 0 = tails.

== Stochastic drifts in population studies ==
Longitudinal studies of secular events are frequently conceptualized as consisting of a trend component fitted by a polynomial, a cyclical component often fitted by an analysis based on autocorrelations or on a Fourier series, and a random component (stochastic drift) to be removed.

In the course of the time series analysis, identification of cyclical and stochastic drift components is often attempted by alternating autocorrelation analysis and differencing of the trend. Autocorrelation analysis helps to identify the correct phase of the fitted model while the successive differencing transforms the stochastic drift component into white noise.

Stochastic drift can also occur in population genetics where it is known as genetic drift. A finite population of randomly reproducing organisms would experience changes from generation to generation in the frequencies of the different genotypes. This may lead to the fixation of one of the genotypes, and even the emergence of a new species. In sufficiently small populations, drift can also neutralize the effect of deterministic natural selection on the population.

== Stochastic drift in economics and finance ==
Time series variables in economics and finance — for example, stock prices, gross domestic product, etc. — generally evolve stochastically and frequently are non-stationary. They are typically modelled as either trend-stationary or difference stationary. A trend stationary process {y_{t}} evolves according to

$$y_t = f(t) + e_t$$

where t is time, f is a deterministic function, and e_{t} is a zero-long-run-mean stationary random variable. In this case the stochastic term is stationary and hence there is no stochastic drift, though the time series itself may drift with no fixed long-run mean due to the deterministic component f(t) not having a fixed long-run mean. This non-stochastic drift can be removed from the data by regressing $y_t$ on $t$ using a functional form coinciding with that of f, and retaining the stationary residuals. In contrast, a unit root (difference stationary) process evolves according to

$$y_t = y_{t-1} + c + u_t$$

where $u_t$ is a zero-long-run-mean stationary random variable; here c is a non-stochastic drift parameter: even in the absence of the random shocks u_{t}, the mean of y would change by c per period. In this case the non-stationarity can be removed from the data by first differencing, and the differenced variable $z_t = y_t - y_{t-1}$ will have a long-run mean of c and hence no drift. But even in the absence of the parameter c (that is, even if c=0), this unit root process exhibits drift, and specifically stochastic drift, due to the presence of the stationary random shocks u_{t}: a once-occurring non-zero value of u is incorporated into the same period's y, which one period later becomes the one-period-lagged value of y and hence affects the new period's y value, which itself in the next period becomes the lagged y and affects the next y value, and so forth forever. So after the initial shock hits y, its value is incorporated forever into the mean of y, so we have stochastic drift. Again this drift can be removed by first differencing y to obtain z which does not drift.

In the context of monetary policy, one policy question is whether a central bank should attempt to achieve a fixed growth rate of the price level from its current level in each time period, or whether to target a return of the price level to a predetermined growth path. In the latter case no price level drift is allowed away from the predetermined path, while in the former case any stochastic change to the price level permanently affects the expected values of the price level at each time along its future path. In either case the price level has drift in the sense of a rising expected value, but the cases differ according to the type of non-stationarity: difference stationarity in the former case, but trend stationarity in the latter case.

== See also ==
- Secular variation
- Decomposition of time series
