= Bry and Boschan routine =

In econometrics, the Bry and Boschan routine finds statistical maxima and minima while using certain censoring rules and phase and cycle length constraints.

The OECD has composite leading indicators and turning points that are recession indicators with peak through the trough turning points chronologies determined by the rules in a computer routine (Bry and Boschan)

The U.S. National Bureau of Economic Research (NBER) uses a computer routine (Bry and Boschan) and includes a Phase-Average Trend (PAT) detrending procedure. The turning point detection algorithm is decoupled from the de-trending procedure.
