= Anne K. Rweyora =

Ugandan industrial designer

- Citizenship: Ugandan
- Education: Degree in Industrial design
- Organization: Smart Havens Africa
- Known for: She is the founder and managing director of Smart Havens Africa.
- Awards: Winner of the Takeda Entrepreneurship Award 2019.

Anne K. Rweyora is a ugandan entrepreneur, industrial designer and social innovator known for her work in affordable housing. She is the founder and managing director of Smart Havens Africa, a social enterprise that develops low-cost, eco-friendly housing solutions aimed primarily at low-income women in Uganda and across Africa.

== Early life and background ==
Anne experienced housing insecurity as she was growing up following the death of her father Her family was displaced from their home, an experience that exposed her to challenges of inadequate housing and poverty. This formative experience influenced her commitment to improving access to housing for vulnerable populations.

Although she aspired to study civil engineering, financial constraints led her to pursue a degree in industrial design. Despite this, she maintained a strong interest in housing and community development.

A teacher by training, Rweyora began working on the idea after volunteering in South Sudan as a social worker, she felt that home ownership should be more attainable to the average working women.

== Career ==
Rweyora is the founder and managing director of Smart Havens Africa, a Ugandan social enterprise established in 2018. The organisation focuses on delivering affordable housing through environmentally sustainable construction technologies and innovative financing models such as rent-to-own schemes.

The enterprise targets low-income households especially women-headed families who are often excluded from traditional housing finance systems. It combines access to land, low-cost construction technologies and flexible payment plans to enable home ownership.

Smart Havens Africa also integrates social impact into its operation by training and employing women in construction, thereby promoting gender equality and economic empowerment. Under her leadership, Smart Havens Africa has built over 100 affordable homes and created employment opportunities particularly for women in construction. Her works also emphasize women's economic empowerment, sustainable construction practices and financial inclusion for low-income households.

== Innovation and impact ==
Rweyora's approach integrates housing, environmental sustainability and social impact. Her projects incorporate renewable energy solutions, rainwater harvesting system and eco-friendly building materials.

Through this model, Smart Havens Africa has built over 100 affordable homes in Uganda, enabled pathways to home ownership for low-income families, created employment opportunities for women in construction and promoted sustainable building practices. The Organisation aims to scale its impact across East Africa and beyond with a long-term vision of enabling upto one million women-headed households to own homes.

== Awards and recognition ==
Anne K. Rweyora has received several recognitions for her work in innovation and social entrepreneurship including:

- Finalist in the Africa Prize for Engineering Innovation by the Royal Academy of Engineering.
- Winner of the Takeda Entrepreneurship Award (2019)
- Fellow of the Global Good Fund.
- Alumna of the Global Social Benefit Institute (GSBI).

Her work has also been featured by international media outlets such as CNN and BBC.

== Personal philosophy ==
Rweyora's work is strongly shaped by her personal experiences and a desire to improve the lives of women facing housing insecurity. She advocates for inclusive development and believes that access to safe and affordable housing is essential for economic stability and social progress.
