= Pierre Perron =

Canadian econometrician

- Born: March 14, 1959 (age 67)
- Education: Yale University; Queen's University; McGill University
- Known for: Phillips–Perron test
- Scientific career
- Fields: Econometrics
- Workplaces: Boston University
- Doctoral advisor: Peter C. B. Phillips

Pierre Perron (born March 14, 1959) is a Canadian econometrician at Boston University. Perron is known for the Phillips–Perron test of a unit root in time series regression, which was the result of his Ph.D. studies under Peter C. B. Phillips.
