= Graciela González Farías =

Mexican statistician (born 1957)

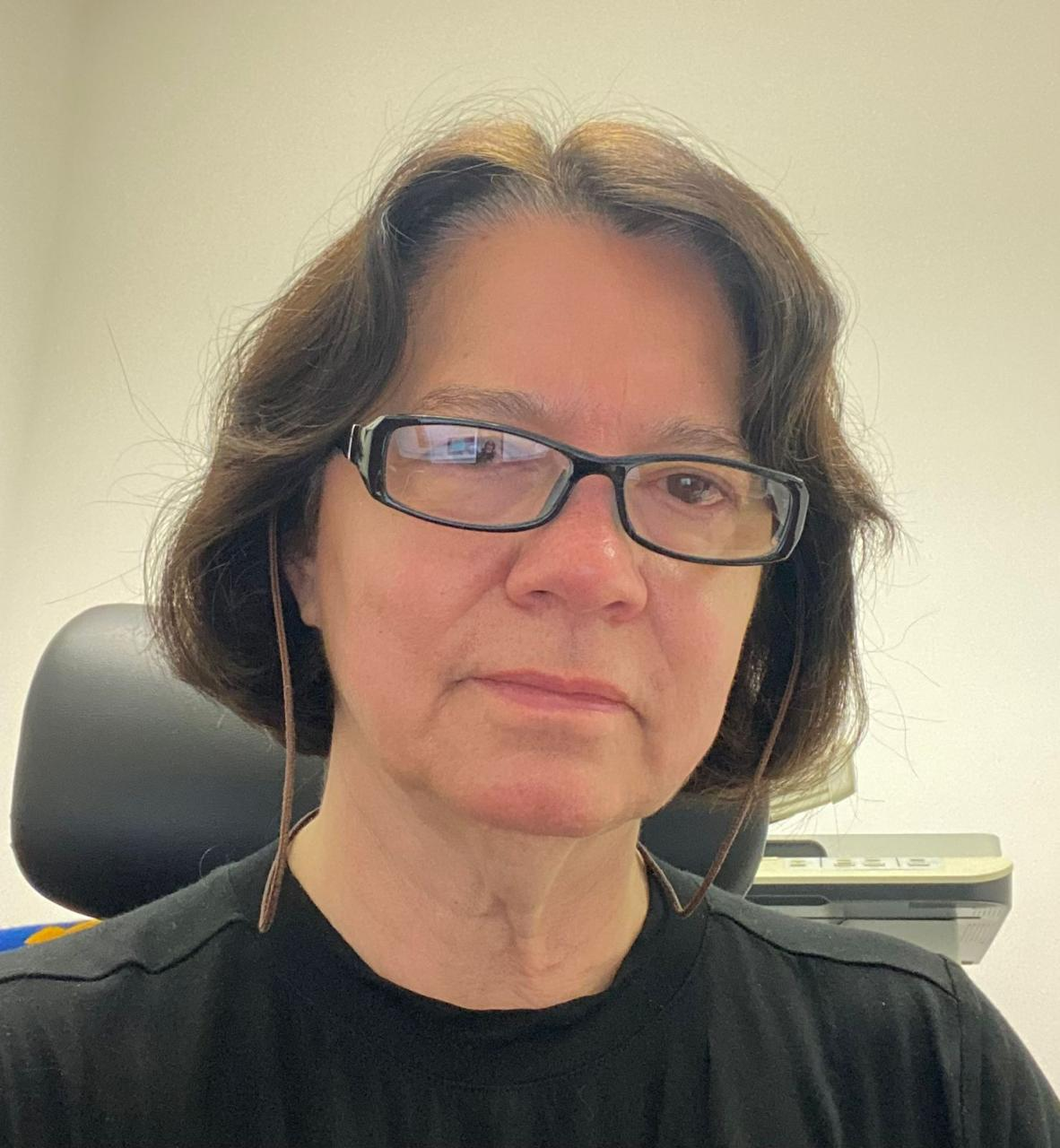
- Citizenship: Mexican
- Education: North Carolina State University (PhD)
- Occupation: Statistician
- Years active: 1979 to date
- Partner: Rogelio Ramos Quiroga
- Children: 2
- Scientific career
- Workplaces: Universidad de Navarra; CIMAT; Instituto Tecnológico de Estudios Superiores de Monterrey; Universidad Carlos III de Madrid
- Doctoral advisor: David Dickey; Peter Bloomfield

Graciela María González Farías is a Mexican statistician whose research involves Statistical Inference and Modeling, with an emphasis on Multivariate Analysis, Time Series, Spatial Statistics, and Nonlinear Models, in particular, on applications and problems that arise specifically in Econometrics, Biostatistics, and Scientific Replicability. She was a invited researcher at the Universidad de Navarra, a former director of CIMAT's branch campus in Monterrey, Mexico, and a former president of the Asociación Mexicana de Estadística (Mexican Statistical Association). She is also an Emeritus researcher at SECIHTI, National System of Researchers.

== Education and career ==
González Farías studied mathematics at the Autonomous University of Nuevo León, where she earned a bachelor's degree in 1979. She earned a master's degree in Experimental Statistics from the Colegio de Postgraduados in 1986, and completed a PhD in Statistics in 1992 at the North Carolina State University. Her doctoral dissertation, A New Unit Root Test for Autoregressive Time Series, was jointly supervised by David Dickey and Peter Bloomfield.

She became a researcher at CIMAT from 1999 to 2026 and was director of CIMAT Monterrey from 2010 to 2023. She served as head of CIMAT's Technological Transfer Office from 2013 to 2017.

González Farías is an Invited Researcher at the University of Navarra since March 6, 2026. She previously served as an Adjunct Professor at the Mathematical, Computational and Modeling Sciences Center (MCMSC) and in the College of Liberal Arts and Sciences at Arizona State University from 2012 to 2014. In addition, she held a position as a Visiting Professor in the Department of Statistics and Econometrics at Carlos III University of Madrid (Getafe) from September 1992 to September 1993.

González Farías has visited institutions in Germany (Max Plank Institute in Experimental Economics), the US, Canada, Chile, and Colombia, fostering notable collaborations with research groups in Spain. She is actively involved in promoting gender equality and non-discrimination in science, dedicating much of her work to mentoring young scientists in Mexico and across Latin America. Additionally, she has participated in over 100 national and international seminars, conferences, and events, serving as an organizer, panelist, or speaker.

She is associate editor of the Journal of Nonparametric Statistics and Communications in Statistics, both since 2007. She has also participated in the creation of various programs in statistics and data science, especially master's programs at different levels and institutions: Instituto Tecnológico de Estudios Superiores de Monterrey, CIMAT, and Mexican National Institute of Statistics and Geography (INEGI).

== Publications ==
González Farías has more than 70 scientific articles published mainly in international journals. Her work on unit roots has been recognized as an influential contribution and republished in the two-volume set called "Recent Developments in Time Series," edited by Paul Newbold and Stephen J. Leybourne, Professors of Econometrics at the University of Nottingham:

- Pantula, S.G., G. Gonzalez-Farias, and W.A. Fuller (1994). A comparison of unit root test criteria. As a chapter in the book edited by The International Library of Critical Writings in Econometrics, Series Editors: Mark Blaug and Adrian Darnell (2003).

== Academic activity ==
Throughout her career, González Farías has participated in multiple academic committees for the organization of academic events and the promotion of Statistics, Mathematics and Science in general. To mention a few of these, the following stand out:

- Member of the Organizing Committee of the International Symposium of Forecasting 2003 in Mérida, Yucatán.
- Member of the Advisory Board of the GeoIntelligence Laboratory (GeoINT), CentroGEO .
- Member of the Board of Directors of the Mexican Mathematical Society, Secretary of Liaison (2013-2015).
- Jury for the 2013 Jan Tinbergen Awards for young statisticians from developing countries” ISI 59th, Hong Kong.
- Local Organizing Committee of the Pan-American Institute for Advanced Studies in Probability and Statistics, NSF-CIMAT.
- President of the Organizing Committee of the 1st Canada-Mexico Statistics Meeting.
- VP-Finance of the International Society for Business and Industrial Statistics (ISBIS).
- Member of the Technical Advisory Board of the Mexican User Satisfaction Index (IMSU) from 2006 to date for the evaluation of the impacts of social programs
- President of the National Organizing Committee of the XX and XXI Mexican National Statistics Forum (2005-2007).
- Founding member of the Council of the International Society for Business and Industrial Statistics (ISBIS).
- Member of the Local Organizing Committee -Joint Bernoulli Society/Institute of Mathematical Statistics Conference, 2000, Guanajuato, Mexico.

González Farías has also participated in various commissions in CONACYT, such as, for example, the Mexican National System of Researchers Review Committee (2018-2020, 2022), Member of the External Review Committee of the CentroGEO (2016-2018, 2019-2021), Evaluation Committee of the CONACYT-INEGI Sector Fund (2015-2019), and Evaluation of Mexican National Quality Posgraduate Programs (PNPC) (multiple times).

González Farías also participated in the Coordinating Group for Mathematical Modeling of COVID-19, the Evaluation of Frontier Science and Basic Science projects, the Advisory Board for Liaison of the Public Research Centers in Mexico, and the Technical Committee of the Thematic Network: Mathematical and Computational Modelling (2009-2014). She served as Counselor of the Advisory or Academic Council (CCA) of the Governing Body of INEGI, CentroGEO, IPICYT, and CIDE, to mention just a few.

== Recognition ==
González Farías is an Emeritus researcher of the Mexican National System of Researchers. She is also an elected member of the International Statistical Institute and the Sigma Xi, The Scientific Research Society. She was also a member by invitation to the Committee on the Dating of Cycles of the Economy of Mexico, organized by the Mexican Institute of Finance Executives in collaboration with INEGI, from January 4, 2021, to February 2023.

While a student at the Department of Statistics, North Carolina State University, she was accepted to the Mu Sigma Rho, National Statistical Honor Fraternity as a recognition for obtaining the best basic exam and academic performance.

== Academic associations ==
González Farías is active in various scientific organizations:

- The American Statistical Association (ASA, since 1983).
- Mexican Association of Statistics (AME, Former President)
- Mexican Mathematical Society (SMM, Former Secretary of Liaison).
- International Statistical Institute. (ISI, Elected member)
- International Society for Business and Industrial Statistics (ISBIS, Founding member group).
- Bernoulli Society for Mathematical Statistics and Probability (BS).
- Institute of Mathematical Statistics (IMS).
