= Economic stability =

Absence of excessive fluctuations in the macroeconomy

Economic stability is the absence of excessive fluctuations in the macroeconomy. An economy with fairly constant output growth and low and stable inflation would be considered economically stable. An economy with frequent large recessions, a pronounced business cycle, very high or variable inflation, or frequent financial crises would be considered economically unstable.

== Measures ==
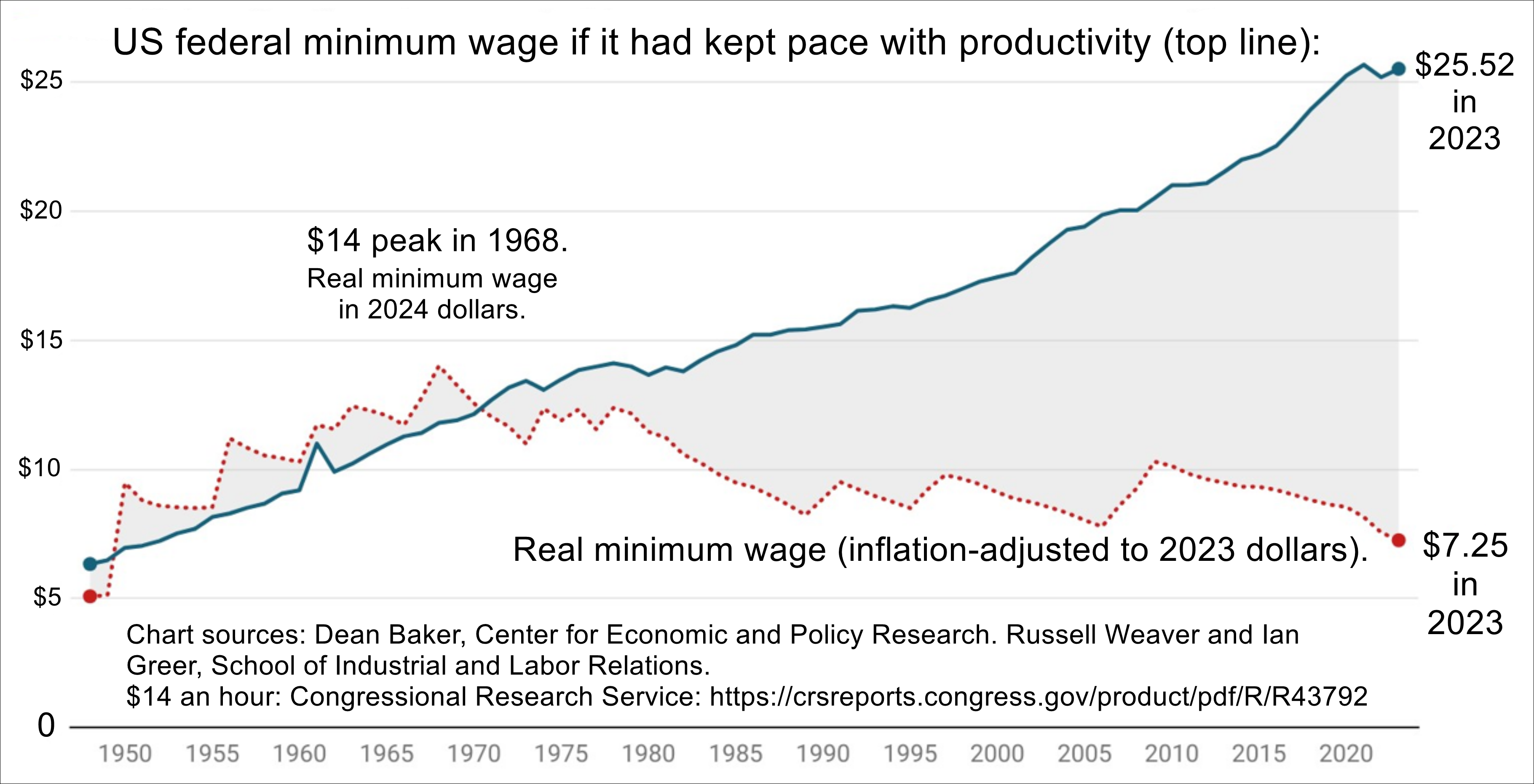
US federal minimum wage if it had kept pace with productivity. Also, the real minimum wage.

Real macroeconomic output can be decomposed into a trend and a cyclical part, where the variance of the cyclical series derived from the filtering technique (e.g., the band-pass filter, or the most commonly used Hodrick–Prescott filter) serves as the primary measure of departure from economic stability.

A simple method of decomposition involves regressing real output on the variable "time", or on a polynomial in the time variable, and labeling the predicted levels of output as the trend and the residuals as the cyclical portion. Another approach is to model real output as difference stationary with drift, with the drift component being the trend.

== Causes ==
Democracy tends to improve economic stability.

Macroeconomic instability can be brought on by the lack of financial stability, as exemplified by the Great Recession which was brought on by the 2008 financial crisis.

Monetarists consider that a highly variable money supply leads to a highly variable output level. Milton Friedman believed that this was a key contributor to the Great Depression of the 1930s.

John Maynard Keynes believed, and subsequent Keynesians believe, that unstable aggregate demand leads to macroeconomic instability, while real business cycle theorists believe that fluctuations in aggregate supply drive business cycles.

== Effects ==
Economic instability can have a number of negative effects on the overall welfare of people and nations by creating an environment in which economic assets lose value and investment is hindered or stopped. This can lead to unemployment, economic recession, or in extreme cases, a societal collapse.

== Stabilization policy ==
When a stabilization policy is implemented, it generally involves the use of either monetary policy or fiscal policy. Either of these may be advocated by Keynesian economists. However, they are generally opposed by monetarists and real business cycle theorists. Monetarists believe that well-intentioned countercyclical monetary policy will generally be counterproductive, adding to the existing variability of real output, and real business cycle theorists believe that such policies are misguided because they do not address the underlying causes of fluctuations, which they believe lie on the supply side of the economy.

== See also ==
- Automatic stabilizer
- Stability and Growth Pact
- Global financial system
- Democracy and economic growth
- International Monetary Fund
