= SVAR =

SVAR may refer to:

- Vector autoregression#Structural vs. reduced form
- National Archives of Sweden
