= David Dickey =

American statistician

David A. Dickey
- Born: c. 1945 (age 80–81); Ohio
- Education: Iowa State University; Miami University
- Known for: Dickey–Fuller test
- Scientific career
- Fields: Statistics, econometrics
- Workplaces: North Carolina State University
- Doctoral advisor: Wayne Fuller
- Doctoral students: Graciela González Farías

David Alan Dickey (born c. 1945) is an American statistician who has specialised in time series analysis. He is a William Neal Reynolds Professor in the Department of Statistics at North Carolina State University. The Dickey–Fuller test is named for him and Wayne Arthur Fuller. David Dickey is listed as an ISI highly cited researcher by the ISI Highly Cited Database of the ISI Web of Knowledge. He is an elected Fellow (2000) of the American Statistical Association. He is from Ohio.

== Selected works ==
- Dickey, D. A.; Fuller, W. A. (1979). "Distribution of the Estimators for Autoregressive Time Series with a Unit Root". Journal of the American Statistical Association. 74 (366): 427–431. doi:10.2307/2286348. JSTOR 2286348.
