= Peter Bloomfield (statistician) =

American statistiican

- Education: University of London
- Scientific career
- Fields: Statistics
- Workplaces: Princeton University; North Carolina State University
- Thesis: Some Problems in the Spectral Analysis of Time Series with Missing Values (1970)
- Doctoral advisor: David Roxbee Cox
- Doctoral students: Yoav Benjamini; Graciela González Farías; Scott Zeger

Peter Bloomfield is a British statistician.

Bloomfield completed his doctorate at the University of London in 1970. His doctoral dissertation, Some Problems in the Spectral Analysis of Time Series with Missing Values, was supervised by David Roxbee Cox. Bloomfield moved to the United States to teach at Princeton University, where from 1979 to 1983, he chaired the Department of Statistics. Bloomfield joined the North Carolina State University faculty later that year. Upon retirement, he was granted emeritus status.

Bloomfield was elected a fellow of the Institute of Mathematical Statistics in 1976, and to an equivalent honor by the American Statistical Association in 1993.
