= Scott Zeger =

American biostatistician

Scott Lewis Zeger is an American biostatistician.

Zeger earned his bachelor of arts degree from the University of Pennsylvania, a master's of science in at Drexel University, and his doctorate at Princeton University. Zeger's doctoral dissertation, Frequency Domain Analyses of Spatial Time Series with Application to Ozone, was written under the direction of Peter Bloomfield, and published in 1982. Zeger is the John C. Malone Professor of Biostatistics at Johns Hopkins University.

Zeger was elected a fellow of the American Statistical Association in 1995. He was elected to membership of the National Academy of Medicine in 2006. In 1986, Zeger was awarded the George W. Snedecor Award by the Committee of Presidents of Statistical Societies.
