= Asymmetric cointegration =

In statistics and econometrics, asymmetric cointegration describes a long-term relationship between variables where positive and negative shocks to the equilibrium have different impacts. This builds upon the concept of cointegration, which refers to a long-term, stable relationship between two or more variables, even if those variables individually fluctuate over time.

For example, consider the price of a commodity and the price of a related derivative. While both prices might fluctuate daily, they are expected to maintain a long-term equilibrium relationship. However, a sudden increase in the commodity price might lead to a faster adjustment in the derivative price than a sudden decrease. This difference in adjustment speeds would be an example of asymmetric cointegration.

Because standard cointegration tests assume symmetric adjustment, they may fail to detect asymmetric cointegration. Therefore, specialized tests, such as threshold autoregressive and momentum-threshold cointegration tests, are employed to investigate for this asymmetry. These tests help determine if the adjustment process back to equilibrium differs depending on the direction of the deviation.
