= Berlin procedure =

The Berlin procedure (BV) is a mathematical procedure for time series decomposition and seasonal adjustment of monthly and quarterly economic time series. The mathematical foundations of the procedure were developed in 1960's at Berlin Technical University and the German Institute for Economic Research (DIW). The most important user of the procedure is the Federal Statistical Office of Germany.

BV4.1 is a software implementation of the latest version 4.1 of BV, available as freeware for non-commercial purposes.

== Specific features of the procedure ==
The latest version 4.1 of the Berlin procedure is distinguished from other commonly used decomposition and seasonal adjustment methods (i.e. X-12-ARIMA) by the following characteristic features:

- The procedure works well even with time series showing strongly changing seasonal patterns.
- Trend-cycles are depicted plausibly in terms of economic points of view.
- The cost-benefit ratio is low as the user does not need special training or even expert knowledge or long-term experience with the procedure to make high-quality analyses.
- On principle the analysis results do not depend on the respective user since there is no need to determine any series-specific parameters of the procedure.
- As linear regression models are used, on principle there are no differences between indirect and direct analysis results of aggregate series.
