= Unit root test =

Time series statistical test

In statistics, a unit root test tests whether a time series variable is non-stationary and possesses a unit root. The null hypothesis is generally defined as the presence of a unit root and the alternative hypothesis is either stationarity, trend stationarity or explosive root depending on the test used.

== General approach ==
In general, the approach to unit root testing implicitly assumes that the time series to be tested $[y_t]_{t=1}^T$ can be written as,

$$y_t = D_t + z_t + \varepsilon_t$$

where,

- $D_t$ is the deterministic component (trend, seasonal component, etc.)
- $z_t$ is the stochastic component.
- $\varepsilon_t$ is the stationary error process.

The task of the test is to determine whether the stochastic component contains a unit root or is stationary.

== Main tests ==
Other popular tests include:

- augmented Dickey–Fuller test
  this is valid in large samples.
- Phillips–Perron test
- KPSS test
  here the null hypothesis is trend stationarity rather than the presence of a unit root.
- ADF-GLS test

Unit root tests are closely linked to serial correlation tests. However, while all processes with a unit root will exhibit serial correlation, not all serially correlated time series will have a unit root. Popular serial correlation tests include:

- Breusch–Godfrey test
- Ljung–Box test
- Durbin–Watson test
