= M. Hashem Pesaran =

British–Iranian economist

Mohammad Hashem Pesaran
- Born: 30 March 1946 (age 80); Shiraz, Iran

Academic background
- Education: Salford University (BSc 1968); Cambridge University (PhD 1972), (MA 2003)
- Doctoral advisor: D. G. Champernowne

Academic work
- Discipline: Econometrics
- Institutions: Central Bank of Iran; University of Southern California; UCLA; Cambridge University
- Website: Information at IDEAS / RePEc

Mohammad Hashem Pesaran (born 30 March 1946) is a British–Iranian economist.

He received his BSc in economics at the University of Salford (England) and his PhD in economics at Cambridge University. Previously, Pesaran was professor at the Faculty of Economics at the University of Cambridge and a professorial fellow of Trinity College, Cambridge. He is the John Elliott Distinguished Chair in Economics at the University of Southern California and has held that position since August 2005. He also serves as the director of the USC Dornsife Center for Applied Financial Economics Research. In January 2013, he was made a distinguished professor at USC.

He has been head of the Economic Research Department of the Central Bank of Iran and the under-secretary of the Iranian Ministry of Education. He has also been a professor of economics and the director of the Applied Econometrics Program at UCLA, and visiting professor at the Institute of Advanced Studies in Vienna, at the University of Pennsylvania, and the University of Southern California (USC).

He is a fellow of the British Academy, a fellow of the Econometric Society, and a fellow of the Journal of Econometrics. He is the recipient of the 1990 George Sell Prize from The Institute of Petroleum, London, the 1992 Royal Economic Society Prize for the best article published in The Economic Journal for the years 1990 and 1991, and the joint recipient of the Econometric Reviews Best Paper Award 2002–2004 for his paper on Long Run Structural Modeling.

Pesaran is the founding editor of the Journal of Applied Econometrics, and a co-developer of Microfit (versions 1–5), an econometric software package published by Oxford University Press.

He has been a member of the board of trustees of the Economic Research Forum for Arab Countries, Iran, and Turkey over the period, and has served as a member of the World Bank's Council of Advisers for the Middle East and North Africa, 1996–2000.

Pesaran has served as a director on the board of Acorn Investment Trust and Cambridge Econometrics, and is now honorary president of Cambridge Econometrics. In 1997 he became a charter member of the Oliver Wyman Institute, serving until January 2000. Between 2000 and 2002 he was appointed vice-president in charge of development and computerised trading systems at Tudor Investment Corporation, Connecticut, US, and in October 2004 he was appointed as director of USC College Institute for Economic Policy Research.

He has more than 200 publications in the areas of econometrics, empirical finance, macroeconomics, and the Iranian economy, and is an expert in the economics of Oil and the Middle East.

Pesaran was awarded several honorary degrees: by the University of Salford in 1993, the University of Goethe, Frankfurt in 2008, the University of Maastricht in 2013 and the Prague University of Economics and Business in 2016.

His daughter, Evaleila Pesaran, is a Lecturer and Fellow in Politics and International Relations at Murray Edwards College at the University of Cambridge and is the author of the book Iran's Struggle for Economic Independence. His son, Bijan Pesaran, is the Robert A. Groff Professor of Teaching and Research in Neurosurgery II, and Professor of Neuroscience and Bioengineering at the University of Pennsylvania.

== Selected publications ==
For a full list refer to his personal homepage at Cambridge University.

- Mohammad Hashem Pesaran; Martin Weale (2005). Survey expectations. University of Cambridge.
- Mohammad Hashem Pesaran; Til Schuermann; L. Vanessa Smith (2008). Forecasting economic and financial variables with global VARs. CESifo.
- Katrin Assenmacher-Wesche; Mohammad Hashem Pesaran (2008). A VECX* model of the Swiss economy. University of Cambridge.
- Samuel Hanson; Mohammad Hashem Pesaran; Til Schuermann (2005). Firm heterogeneity and credit risk diversification. University of Cambridge.
- Pesaran, M Hashem (2006). "Estimation and inference in large heterogeneous panels with a multifactor error structure". Econometrica. 74 (4): 967–1042. doi:10.1111/j.1468-0262.2006.00692.x. S2CID 8698909.
- Bahram Pesaran; Mohammad Hashem Pesaran (2007). Modelling volatilities and conditional correlations in futures markets with a multivariate T distribution. CESifo.
- Mohammad Hashem Pesaran; L. Vanessa Smith; Takashi Yamagata (2008). Panel unit root tests in the presence of a multifactor error structure. CESifo.
- Mohammad Hashem Pesaran (1987). Formation of inflation expectations in British manufacturing industries. University of Cambridge.
- Mohammad Hashem Pesaran; Paolo Zaffaroni (2008). Optimal asset allocation with factor models for large portfolios. CESifo.
