= Paul Newbold =

British economist

- Born: 12 August 1945; Sileby, England
- Died: 18 November 2016 (aged 71); Leicester, United Kingdom

Academic background
- Education: University of Wisconsin–Madison; London School of Economics
- Influences: George E. P. Box; Clive Granger

Academic work
- Discipline: Econometrics; Time series analysis
- Institutions: University of Illinois at Urbana–Champaign; University of Nottingham
- Notable ideas: Cointegration; Spurious Regression

Paul Newbold (12 August 1945 – 18 November 2016) was a British economist known for his contributions to econometrics and time series analysis. His most famous contribution was a 1974 paper co-authored with Clive Granger which introduced the concept of spurious regressions.

Newbold earned his B.Sc. from London School of Economics and his Ph.D. under supervision of George E. P. Box at University of Wisconsin–Madison. He later was a professor most notably at the University of Illinois at Urbana–Champaign and the University of Nottingham. He also taught courses on time series analysis while on sabbatical at the University of Chicago Graduate School of Business (now the University of Chicago Booth School of Business). He has written a very popular and thorough statistics textbook: "Statistics for Business and Economics" along with W L Carlson and B Thorne, now in its 10th edition. He also co-authored with Clive Granger the influential textbook: "Forecasting Economic Time Series" (2nd ed; Academic Press, 1986).
