= Microfit =

Statistical software

Microfit is a statistics package developed by Bahram Pesaran and M. Hashem Pesaran, and published by Oxford University Press. It is designed for econometric modelling with time series data.
