= KPSS test =

Time series statistical test

In econometrics, Kwiatkowski–Phillips–Schmidt–Shin (KPSS) tests are used for testing a null hypothesis that an observable time series is stationary around a deterministic trend (i.e. trend-stationary) against the alternative of a unit root.

Contrary to most unit root tests, the presence of a unit root is not the null hypothesis but the alternative. Additionally, in the KPSS test, the absence of a unit root is not a proof of stationarity but, by design, of trend-stationarity. This is an important distinction since it is possible for a time series to be non-stationary, have no unit root yet be trend-stationary. In both unit root and trend-stationary processes, the mean can be growing or decreasing over time; however, in the presence of a shock, trend-stationary processes are mean-reverting (i.e. transitory, the time series will converge again towards the growing mean, which was not affected by the shock) while unit-root processes have a permanent impact on the mean (i.e. no convergence over time).

Later, Denis Kwiatkowski, Peter C. B. Phillips, Peter Schmidt and Yongcheol Shin (1992) proposed a test of the null hypothesis that an observable series is trend-stationary (stationary around a deterministic trend). The series is expressed as the sum of deterministic trend, random walk, and stationary error, and the test is the Lagrange multiplier test of the hypothesis that the random walk has zero variance. KPSS-type tests are intended to complement unit root tests, such as the Dickey–Fuller tests. By testing both the unit root hypothesis and the stationarity hypothesis, one can distinguish series that appear to be stationary, series that appear to have a unit root, and series for which the data (or the tests) are not sufficiently informative to be sure whether they are stationary or integrated.
