= Phillips–Perron test =

Statistical test

In statistics, the Phillips–Perron test (named after Peter C. B. Phillips and Pierre Perron) is a unit root test. That is, it is used in time series analysis to test the null hypothesis that a time series is integrated of order 1. It builds on the Dickey–Fuller test of the null hypothesis $\rho = 1$ in $\Delta y_{t}= (\rho -1)y_{t-1}+u_{t}\,$, where $\Delta$ is the first difference operator. Like the augmented Dickey–Fuller test, the Phillips–Perron test addresses the issue that the process generating data for $y_{t}$ might have a higher order of autocorrelation than is admitted in the test equation—making $y_{t-1}$ endogenous and thus invalidating the Dickey–Fuller t-test. Whilst the augmented Dickey–Fuller test addresses this issue by introducing lags of $\Delta y_{t}$ as regressors in the test equation, the Phillips–Perron test makes a non-parametric correction to the t-test statistic. The test is robust with respect to unspecified autocorrelation and heteroscedasticity in the disturbance process of the test equation.

Davidson and MacKinnon (2004) report that the Phillips–Perron test performs worse in finite samples than the augmented Dickey–Fuller test.
