= CentroGeo =

Mexican academic institute

- Type: Public
- Established: 1994
- Affiliations: CONACyT
- Location: Mexico City, Mexico; 19.291903°N 99.221414°W
- Website: www.centrogeo.org.mx

The Center for Research in Geography and Geomatics Ing. Jorge L. Tamayo (Spanish: Centro de Investigación en Ciencias de Información Geoespacial, CentroGeo), is a Mexican academic institution dedicated to research, education, technological innovation and dissemination of knowledge in geomatics and contemporary geography, internally and internationally.

It is a public research center integrated to CONACyT. The CentroGeo has a postgraduate program and research lines in Geomatics.

As part of its strategy to work, the CentroGeo develops oriented programs and links with various sectors of society and the wide dissemination of knowledge generated domestically or internationally and which form part of the intellectual heritage of the Geomatics Center and own activities.

Applied research in the CentroGeo has a clear focus on generating Geomatics solutions for a wide variety of issues facing organizations. In May 2018, CentroGeo and UADY signed an agreement to create new degrees.
