= T-statistic =

Ratio in statistics

In statistics, the t-statistic is the ratio of the difference in a number’s estimated value from its assumed value to its standard error. It is used in hypothesis testing via Student's t-test. The t-statistic is used in a t-test to determine whether to support or reject the null hypothesis. It is very similar to the z-score but with the difference that t-statistic is used when the sample size is small or the population standard deviation is unknown. For example, the t-statistic is used in estimating the population mean from a sampling distribution of sample means if the population standard deviation is unknown. It is also used along with p-value when running hypothesis tests where the p-value tells us what the odds are of the results to have happened.

== Definition and features ==
Let $\hat\beta$ be an estimator of parameter β in some statistical model. Then a t-statistic for this parameter is any quantity of the form

$$t_{\hat{\beta}} = \frac{\hat\beta - \beta_0}{\operatorname{s.e.}(\hat\beta)},$$

where β_{0} is a non-random, known constant, which may or may not match the actual unknown parameter value β, and $\operatorname{s.e.}(\hat\beta)$ is the standard error of the estimator $\hat\beta$ for β.

By default, statistical packages report t-statistic with β_{0} = 0 (these t-statistics are used to test the significance of corresponding regressor). However, when t-statistic is needed to test the hypothesis of the form H_{0}: β = β_{0}, then a non-zero β_{0} may be used.

If $\hat\beta$ is an ordinary least squares estimator in the classical linear regression model (that is, with normally distributed and homoscedastic error terms), and if the true value of the parameter β is equal to β_{0}, then the sampling distribution of the t-statistic is the Student's t-distribution with (n − k) degrees of freedom, where n is the number of observations, and k is the number of regressors (including the intercept).

In the majority of models, the estimator $\hat\beta$ is consistent for β and is distributed asymptotically normally. If the true value of the parameter β is equal to β_{0}, and the quantity $\operatorname{s.e.}(\hat\beta)$ correctly estimates the asymptotic variance of this estimator, then the t-statistic will asymptotically have the standard normal distribution.

In some models the distribution of the t-statistic is different from the normal distribution, even asymptotically. For example, when a time series with a unit root is regressed in the augmented Dickey–Fuller test, the test t-statistic will asymptotically have one of the Dickey–Fuller distributions (depending on the test setting).

== Use ==
Most frequently, t statistics are used in Student's t-tests, a form of statistical hypothesis testing, and in the computation of certain confidence intervals.

The key property of the t statistic is that it is a pivotal quantity – while defined in terms of the sample mean, its sampling distribution does not depend on the population parameters, and thus it can be used regardless of what these may be.

=== Prediction ===
Given a normal distribution $N(\mu, \sigma^2)$ with unknown mean and variance, the t-statistic of a future observation $X_{n+1},$ after one has made n observations, is an ancillary statistic – a pivotal quantity (does not depend on the values of μ and σ^{2}) that is a statistic (computed from observations). This allows one to compute a frequentist prediction interval (a predictive confidence interval), via the following t-distribution:

$$\frac{X_{n+1} - \overline{X}_n}{s_n \sqrt{1 + n^{-1}}} \sim T^{n-1}.$$

Solving for $X_{n+1}$ yields the prediction distribution

$$\overline{X}_n + s_n \sqrt{1 + n^{-1}} \cdot T^{n-1},$$

from which one may compute predictive confidence intervals – given a probability p, one may compute intervals such that 100p% of the time, the next observation $X_{n+1}$ will fall in that interval.

== History ==
The term "t-statistic" is abbreviated from "hypothesis test statistic". In statistics, the t-distribution was first derived as a posterior distribution in 1876 by Helmert and Lüroth. The t-distribution also appeared in a more general form as Pearson distribution Type IV in Karl Pearson's 1895 paper. However, the T-Distribution, also known as Student's T Distribution gets its name from William Sealy Gosset who was first to publish the result in English in his 1908 paper titled "The Probable Error of a Mean" (in Biometrika) using his pseudonym "Student" because his employer preferred their staff to use pen names when publishing scientific papers instead of their real name, so he used the name "Student" to hide his identity. Guinness Brewery in Dublin, Ireland, and was interested in the problems of small samples – for example, the chemical properties of barley where sample sizes might be as few as 3. Hence a second version of the etymology of the term Student is that Guinness did not want their competitors to know that they were using the t-test to determine the quality of raw material. Although it was William Gosset after whom the term "Student" is penned, it was actually through the work of Ronald Fisher that the distribution became well known as "Student's distribution" and "Student's t-test"

== Related concepts ==
- z-score (standardization): If the population parameters are known, then rather than computing the t-statistic, one can compute the z-score; analogously, rather than using a t-test, one uses a z-test. This is rare outside of standardized testing.
- Studentized residual: In regression analysis, the standard errors of the estimators at different data points vary (compare the middle versus endpoints of a simple linear regression), and thus one must divide the different residuals by different estimates for the error, yielding what are called studentized residuals.
- Sample standard score: Replacing the population mean and standard deviation in a z-score by the sample mean and sample standard deviation gives:
  $\frac{x-\bar{X}}{s}$.
  This standardized observation is related to t-statistics because it uses an estimated scale parameter. It should not be confused with the one-sample t-statistics
  $\frac{\bar{X} - \mu_0}{s/\sqrt{n}}$,
  which standardizes the sample mean by its estimated error.

== See also ==
- F-test
- t^{2}-statistic
- Student's T-Distribution
- Student's t-test
- Hypothesis testing
- Folded-t and half-t distributions
- Chi-squared distribution
