= Trend-stationary process =

Stochastic process in time series analysis

In the statistical analysis of time series, a trend-stationary process is a stochastic process from which an underlying trend (function solely of time) can be removed, leaving a stationary process. The trend does not have to be linear.

Conversely, if the process requires differencing to be made stationary, then it is called difference stationary and possesses one or more unit roots. Those two concepts may sometimes be confused, but while they share many properties, they are different in many aspects. It is possible for a time series to be non-stationary, yet have no unit root and be trend-stationary. In both unit root and trend-stationary processes, the mean can be growing or decreasing over time; however, in the presence of a shock, trend-stationary processes are mean-reverting (i.e. transitory, the time series will converge again towards the growing mean, which was not affected by the shock) while unit-root processes have a permanent impact on the mean (i.e. no convergence over time).

== Formal definition ==
A process {Y} is said to be trend-stationary if

$$Y_t = f(t) + e_t,$$

where t is time, f is any function mapping from the reals to the reals, and {e} is a stationary process. The value $f(t)$ is said to be the trend value of the process at time t.

== Simplest example: stationarity around a linear trend ==
Suppose the variable Y evolves according to

$$Y_t = a \cdot t + b + e_t$$

where t is time and e_{t} is the error term, which is hypothesized to be white noise or more generally to have been generated by any stationary process. Then one can use linear regression to obtain an estimate $\hat{a}$ of the true underlying trend slope $a$ and an estimate $\hat{b}$ of the underlying intercept term b; if the estimate $\hat{a}$ is significantly different from zero, this is sufficient to show with high confidence that the variable Y is non-stationary. The residuals from this regression are given by

$$\hat{e}_t = Y_t - \hat{a} \cdot t - \hat{b}.$$

If these estimated residuals can be statistically shown to be stationary (more precisely, if one can reject the hypothesis that the true underlying errors are non-stationary), then the residuals are referred to as the detrended data, and the original series {Y_{t}} is said to be trend-stationary even though it is not stationary.

== Stationarity around other types of trend ==
=== Exponential growth trend ===
Many economic time series are characterized by exponential growth. For example, suppose that one hypothesizes that gross domestic product is characterized by stationary deviations from a trend involving a constant growth rate. Then it could be modeled as

$$\text{GDP}_t = Be^{at}U_t$$

with U_{t} being hypothesized to be a stationary error process. To estimate the parameters $a$ and B, one first takes the natural logarithm (ln) of both sides of this equation:

$$\ln (\text{GDP}_t) =  \ln B + at + \ln (U_t).$$

This log-linear equation is in the same form as the previous linear trend equation and can be detrended in the same way, giving the estimated $(\ln U)_t$ as the detrended value of $(\ln \text{GDP})_t$, and hence the implied $U_t$ as the detrended value of $\text{GDP}_t$, assuming one can reject the hypothesis that $(\ln U)_t$ is non-stationary.

=== Quadratic trend ===
Trends do not have to be linear or log-linear. For example, a variable could have a quadratic trend:

$$Y_t = a \cdot t + c \cdot t^2 + b + e_t.$$

This can be regressed linearly in the coefficients using t and t^{2} as regressors; again, if the residuals are shown to be stationary then they are the detrended values of $Y_t$.

== See also ==
- Trend estimation
- Decomposition of time series
- KPSS test
