= Order of integration =

Summary statistic

In statistics, the order of integration, denoted I(d), of a time series is a summary statistic, which reports the minimum number of differences required to obtain a covariance-stationary series (i.e., a time series whose mean and autocovariance remain constant over time).

The order of integration is a key concept in time series analysis, particularly when dealing with non-stationary data that exhibits trends or other forms of non-stationarity.

== Integration of order d ==
A time series is integrated of order d if

$$(1-L)^d X_t \$$

is a stationary process, where $L$ is the lag operator and $1-L$ is the first difference, i.e.

$$(1-L) X_t = X_t - X_{t-1} = \Delta X.$$

In other words, a process is integrated to order d if taking repeated differences d times yields a stationary process.

In particular, if a series is integrated of order 0, then $(1-L)^0 X_t = X_t$ is stationary.

== Constructing an integrated series ==
An I(d) process can be constructed by summing an I(d − 1) process:

- Suppose $X_t$ is I(d − 1)
- Now construct a series $Z_t = \sum_{k=0}^t X_k$
- Show that Z is I(d) by observing its first-differences are I(d − 1):

$$\Delta Z_t = X_t,$$

where

$$X_t \sim I(d-1). \,$$

== See also ==
- ARIMA
- ARMA
- Random walk
- Unit root test
