= Cyclostationary process =

Signal with properties that vary cyclically with time

A cyclostationary process is a signal having statistical properties that vary cyclically with time. A cyclostationary process can be viewed as multiple interleaved stationary processes. For example, the maximum daily temperature in New York City can be modeled as a cyclostationary process: the maximum temperature on July 21 is statistically different from the temperature on December 20; however, it is a reasonable approximation that the temperature on December 20 of different years has identical statistics. Thus, we can view the random process composed of daily maximum temperatures as 365 interleaved stationary processes, each of which takes on a new value once per year.

== Definition ==
There are two differing approaches to the treatment of cyclostationary processes. The stochastic approach is to view measurements as an instance of an abstract stochastic process model. As an alternative, the more empirical approach is to view the measurements as a single time series of data—that which has actually been measured in practice and, for some parts of theory, conceptually extended from an observed finite time interval to an infinite interval. Both mathematical models lead to probabilistic theories: abstract stochastic probability for the stochastic process model and the more empirical Fraction Of Time (FOT) probability for the alternative model. The FOT probability of some event associated with the time series is defined to be the fraction of time that event occurs over the lifetime of the time series. In both approaches, the process or time series is said to be cyclostationary if and only if its associated probability distributions vary periodically with time. However, in the non-stochastic time-series approach, there is an alternative but equivalent definition: A time series that contains no finite-strength additive sine-wave components is said to exhibit cyclostationarity if and only if there exists some nonlinear time-invariant transformation of the time series that produces finite-strength (non-zero) additive sine-wave components.

== Wide-sense cyclostationarity ==
An important special case of cyclostationary signals is one that exhibits cyclostationarity in second-order statistics (e.g., the autocorrelation function). These are called wide-sense cyclostationary signals, and are analogous to wide-sense stationary processes. The exact definition differs depending on whether the signal is treated as a stochastic process or as a deterministic time series.

=== Cyclostationary stochastic process ===
A stochastic process $x(t)$ of mean $\operatorname{E}[x(t)]$ and autocorrelation function:

$$R_x(t,\tau) = \operatorname{E} \{ x(t + \tau) x^*(t) \},\,$$

where the star denotes complex conjugation, is said to be wide-sense cyclostationary with period $T_0$ if both $\operatorname{E}[x(t)]$ and $R_x(t,\tau)$ are cyclic in $t$ with period $T_0,$ i.e.:

$$\operatorname{E}[x(t)] = \operatorname{E}[x(t+T_0)]\text{ for all }t$$

$$R_x(t,\tau) = R_x(t+T_0; \tau)\text{ for all }t, \tau.$$

The autocorrelation function is thus periodic in t and can be expanded in Fourier series:

$$R_x(t,\tau) = \sum_{n=-\infty}^\infty R_x^{n/T_0}(\tau) e^{j2\pi\frac{n}{T_0}t}$$

where $R_x^{n/T_0}(\tau)$ is called cyclic autocorrelation function and equal to:

$$R_x^{n/T_0}(\tau) = \frac{1}{T_0} \int_{-T_0/2}^{T_0/2} R_x(t,\tau)e^{-j2\pi\frac{n}{T_0}t} \mathrm{d}t .$$

The frequencies $n/T_0,\,n\in \mathbb{Z},$ are called cycle frequencies.

Wide-sense stationary processes are a special case of cyclostationary processes with only $R_x^0(\tau)\ne 0$.

==== Spectral Correlation Function ====
A signal $x(t)$ that offers insight into the cyclic relationships between its spectral components. This function, denoted as $S_x(f, \alpha)$ , helps analyze cyclostationary signals, which exhibit periodic statistical properties. The Spectral Correlation Function highlights correlations between frequencies separated by a cyclic frequency α, allowing identification of modulated or structured signal behaviors in the frequency domain.

The function is mathematically defined as:

$S_x(f, \alpha) = \lim_{T \to \infty} \frac{1}{T} \mathbb{E} \left[ X_T \left( f + \frac{\alpha}{2} \right) X_T^* \left( f - \frac{\alpha}{2} \right) \right]$ .

=== Cyclostationary time series ===
A signal that is just a function of time and not a sample path of a stochastic process can exhibit cyclostationarity properties in the framework of the fraction-of-time point of view. This way, the cyclic autocorrelation function can be defined by:

$$\widehat{R}_x^{n/T_0}(\tau) = \lim_{T\rightarrow +\infty} \frac{1}{T} \int_{-T/2}^{T/2} x(t + \tau) x^*(t) e^{-j2\pi\frac{n}{T_0}t} \mathrm{d}t .$$

If the time-series is a sample path of a stochastic process it is $R_x^{n/T_0}(\tau) =\operatorname{E}\left[\widehat{R}_x^{n/T_0}(\tau)\right]$. If the signal is further cycloergodic, all sample paths exhibit the same cyclic time-averages with probability equal to 1 and thus $R_x^{n/T_0}(\tau) =\widehat{R}_x^{n/T_0}(\tau)$ with probability 1.

=== Frequency domain behavior ===
The Fourier transform of the cyclic autocorrelation function at cyclic frequency α is called cyclic spectrum or spectral correlation density function and is equal to:

$$S_x^\alpha(f) = \int_{-\infty}^{+\infty} R_x^{\alpha}(\tau) e^{-j2\pi f\tau}\mathrm{d}\tau .$$

The cyclic spectrum at zero cyclic frequency is also called average power spectral density. For a Gaussian cyclostationary process, its rate distortion function can be expressed in terms of its cyclic spectrum.

The reason $S_x^\alpha(f)$ is called the spectral correlation density function is that it equals the limit, as filter bandwidth approaches zero, of the expected value of the product of the output of a one-sided bandpass filter with center frequency $f + \alpha /2$ and the conjugate of the output of another one-sided bandpass filter with center frequency $f - \alpha /2$, with both filter outputs frequency shifted to a common center frequency, such as zero, as originally observed and proved in.

For time series, the reason the cyclic spectral density function is called the spectral correlation density function is that it equals the limit, as filter bandwidth approaches zero, of the average over all time of the product of the output of a one-sided bandpass filter with center frequency $f + \alpha /2$ and the conjugate of the output of another one-sided bandpass filter with center frequency $f - \alpha /2$, with both filter outputs frequency shifted to a common center frequency, such as zero, as originally observed and proved in.

=== Example: linearly modulated digital signal ===
An example of cyclostationary signal is the linearly modulated digital signal :

$$x(t) = \sum_{k=-\infty}^{\infty} a_k p(t -kT_0)$$

where $a_k\in\mathbb{C}$ are i.i.d. random variables. The waveform $p(t)$, with Fourier transform $P(f)$, is the supporting pulse of the modulation.

By assuming $\operatorname{E}[a_k] = 0$ and $\operatorname{E}[|a_k|^2]=\sigma_a^2$, the auto-correlation function is:

$$\begin{align}
R_x(t,\tau) &= \operatorname{E}[x(t+\tau)x^*(t)] \\[6pt]
&= \sum_{k,n}\operatorname{E}[a_k a_n^*]p(t+\tau-kT_0)p^*(t-nT_0) \\[6pt]
&= \sigma_a^2\sum_{k}p(t+\tau-kT_0)p^*(t-kT_0) .
\end{align}$$

The last summation is a periodic summation, hence a signal periodic in t. This way, $x(t)$ is a cyclostationary signal with period $T_0$ and cyclic autocorrelation function:

$$\begin{align}
R_x^{n/T_0}(\tau) &= \frac{1}{T_0}\int_{-T_0/2}^{T_0/2} R_x(t,\tau) e^{-j2\pi\frac{n}{T_0}t} \, \mathrm{d}t \\[6pt]
&= \frac{1}{T_0}\int_{-T_0/2}^{T_0/2} \sigma_a^2\sum_{k=-\infty}^\infty p(t+\tau-kT_0)p^*(t-kT_0) e^{-j2\pi\frac{n}{T_0}t}\mathrm{d}t \\[6pt]
&= \frac{\sigma_a^2}{T_0} \sum_{k=-\infty}^\infty\int_{-T_0/2-kT_0}^{T_0/2-kT_0}p(\lambda+\tau)p^*(\lambda) e^{-j2\pi\frac{n}{T_0}(\lambda+kT_0)}\mathrm{d}\lambda \\[6pt]
&= \frac{\sigma_a^2}{T_0} \int_{-\infty}^\infty p(\lambda+\tau)p^*(\lambda) e^{-j2\pi\frac{n}{T_0}\lambda}\mathrm{d}\lambda \\[6pt]
&= \frac{\sigma_a^2}{T_0} p(\tau) * \left\{p^*(-\tau)e^{j2\pi\frac{n}{T_0}\tau}\right\} .
\end{align}$$

with $*$ indicating convolution. The cyclic spectrum is:

$$S_x^{n/T_0}(f) = \frac{\sigma_a^2}{T_0} P(f)P^*\left(f-\frac{n}{T_0}\right) .$$

Typical raised-cosine pulses adopted in digital communications have thus only $n=-1, 0, 1$ non-zero cyclic frequencies.

This same result can be obtained for the non-stochastic time series model of linearly modulated digital signals in which expectation is replaced with infinite time average, but this requires a somewhat modified mathematical method as originally observed and proved in.

== Cyclostationary models ==
It is possible to generalise the class of autoregressive moving average models to incorporate cyclostationary behaviour. For example, Troutman treated autoregressions in which the autoregression coefficients and residual variance are no longer constant but vary cyclically with time. His work follows a number of other studies of cyclostationary processes within the field of time series analysis.

== Polycyclostationarity ==
In practice, signals exhibiting cyclicity with more than one incommensurate period arise and require a generalization of the theory of cyclostationarity. Such signals are called polycyclostationary if they exhibit a finite number of incommensurate periods and almost cyclostationary if they exhibit a countably infinite number. Such signals arise frequently in radio communications due to multiple transmissions with differing sine-wave carrier frequencies and digital symbol rates. The theory was introduced in for stochastic processes and further developed in for non-stochastic time series.

== Higher Order and Strict Sense Cyclostationarity ==
The wide sense theory of time series exhibiting cyclostationarity, polycyclostationarity and almost cyclostationarity originated and developed by Gardner was also generalized by Gardner to a theory of higher-order temporal and spectral moments and cumulants and a strict sense theory of cumulative probability distributions. The encyclopedic book comprehensively teaches all of this and provides a scholarly treatment of the originating publications by Gardner and contributions thereafter by others.

== Applications ==
Cyclostationarity has diverse applications in engineering and science: and. A few examples are:

- Cyclostationarity is used in telecommunications for signal synchronization, transmitter and receiver optimization, and spectrum sensing for cognitive radio;
- In signals intelligence, cyclostationarity is used for signal interception;
- In econometrics, cyclostationarity is used to analyze the periodic behavior of financial-markets;
- Queueing theory utilizes cyclostationary theory to analyze computer networks and car traffic;
- Cyclostationarity is used to analyze mechanical signals produced by rotating and reciprocating machines.

=== Angle-time cyclostationarity of mechanical signals ===
Mechanical signals produced by rotating or reciprocating machines are remarkably well modelled as cyclostationary processes. The cyclostationary family accepts all signals with hidden periodicities, either of the additive type (presence of tonal components) or multiplicative type (presence of periodic modulations). This happens to be the case for noise and vibration produced by gear mechanisms, bearings, internal combustion engines, turbofans, pumps, propellers, etc. The explicit modelling of mechanical signals as cyclostationary processes has been found useful in several applications, such as in noise, vibration, and harshness (NVH) and in condition monitoring. In the latter field, cyclostationarity has been found to generalize the envelope spectrum, a popular analysis technique used in the diagnostics of bearing faults.

One peculiarity of rotating machine signals is that the period of the process is strictly linked to the angle of rotation of a specific component – the “cycle” of the machine. At the same time, a temporal description must be preserved to reflect the nature of dynamical phenomena that are governed by differential equations of time. Therefore, the angle-time autocorrelation function is used,

$$R_x(\theta,\tau) = \operatorname{E} \{ x(t(\theta) + \tau) x^*(t(\theta)) \},\,$$

where $\theta$ stands for angle, $t(\theta)$ for the time instant corresponding to angle $\theta$ and $\tau$ for time delay. Processes whose angle-time autocorrelation function exhibit a component periodic in angle, i.e. such that $R_x(\theta;\tau)$ has a non-zero Fourier-Bohr coefficient for some angular period $\Theta$, are called (wide-sense) angle-time cyclostationary. The double Fourier transform of the angle-time autocorrelation function defines the order-frequency spectral correlation,

$$S_x^\alpha(f) = \lim_{S\rightarrow +\infty} \frac{1}{S} \int_{-S/2}^{S/2}\int_{-\infty}^{+\infty} R_x(\theta,\tau) e^{-j2\pi f\tau} e^{-j2\pi\alpha\frac{\theta}{\Theta}} \, \mathrm{d}\tau \, \mathrm{d}\theta$$

where $\alpha$ is an order (unit in events per revolution) and $f$ a frequency (unit in Hz).

For constant speed of rotation, $\omega$, angle is proportional to time, $\theta = \omega t$. Consequently, the angle-time autocorrelation is simply a cyclicity-scaled traditional autocorrelation; that is, the cycle frequencies are scaled by $\omega$. On the other hand, if the speed of rotation changes with time, then the signal is no longer cyclostationary (unless the speed varies periodically). Therefore, it is not a model for cyclostationary signals. It is not even a model for time-warped cyclostationarity, although it can be a useful approximation for sufficiently slow changes in speed of rotation.

== See also ==
- Seasonality
