= PACF =

PACF may refer to:

- Partial autocorrelation function - a type of Mathematical Function.
- Princeton Area Community Foundation - a public charity based in Lawrenceville, NJ serving Central Jersey through scholarships, awards, grants, and other philanthropic support.
