= Gwilym Jenkins =

Welsh statistician (1932–1982)

- Born: 12 August 1932; Gowerton, Swansea, Wales, UK
- Died: 10 July 1982 (aged 49)
- Education: University College London
- Known for: Box–Jenkins approach
- Scientific career
- Fields: Statistics, time series analysis
- Workplaces: Lancaster University
- Doctoral advisors: Florence Nightingale David; Norman Lloyd Johnson

Gwilym Meirion Jenkins (12 August 1932 – 10 July 1982) was a Welsh statistician and systems engineer, born in Gowerton (Welsh: Tregŵyr), Swansea, Wales. He is most notable for his pioneering work with George Box on autoregressive moving average models, also called Box–Jenkins models, in time-series analysis.

He earned a first class honours degree in mathematics in 1953 followed by a PhD at University College London in 1956. After graduating, he married Margaret Bellingham and together they raised three children. His first job after university was junior fellow at the Royal Aircraft Establishment. He followed this by a series of visiting lecturer and professor positions at Imperial College London, Stanford University, Princeton University, and the University of Wisconsin–Madison, before settling in as a professor of Systems Engineering at Lancaster University in 1965. His initial work concerned discrete time domain models for chemical engineering applications.

While at Lancaster, he founded and became managing director of ISCOL (International Systems Corporation of Lancaster). He remained in academia until 1974, when he left to start his own consulting company.

He served on the Research Section Committee and Council of the Royal Statistical Society in the 1960s, founded the Journal of Systems Engineering in 1969, and briefly carried out public duties with the Royal Treasury in the mid-1970s. He was elected to the Institute of Mathematical Statistics and the Institute of Statisticians.

He was a jazz and blues enthusiast and an accomplished pianist.

He died from Hodgkin's lymphoma in 1982.

== Books by G. M. Jenkins ==
- Spectral analysis and its applications (with D. G. Watts) 1968
- Time Series Analysis: Forecasting and Control (with G. E. P. Box and Gregory C. Reinsel) 2008
- Practical experience with modelling and forecasting time series 1979
- Case studies in time series analysis (with G. McLeod) 1983

== Obituary ==
- G. E. P. Box (1983) G. M. Jenkins, 1933-1982 Journal of the Royal Statistical Society. Series A (General), Vol. 146, No. 2, pp. 205–206.
