= Nonlinear autoregressive exogenous model =

In time series modeling

In time series modeling, a nonlinear autoregressive exogenous model (NARX) is a nonlinear autoregressive model which has exogenous inputs. This means that the model relates the current value of a time series to both:

- past values of the same series; and
- current and past values of the driving (exogenous) series — that is, of the externally determined series that influences the series of interest.

In addition, the model contains an error term which relates to the fact that knowledge of other terms will not enable the current value of the time series to be predicted exactly.

Such a model can be stated algebraically as

$$y_t = F(y_{t-1}, y_{t-2}, y_{t-3}, \ldots, u_{t}, u_{t-1}, u_{t-2}, u_{t-3}, \ldots) + \varepsilon_t$$

Here y is the variable of interest, and u is the externally determined variable. In this scheme, information about u helps predict y, as do previous values of y itself. Here ε is the error term (sometimes called noise). For example, y may be air temperature at noon, and u may be the day of the year (day-number within year).

The function F is some nonlinear function, such as a polynomial. F can be a neural network, a wavelet network, a sigmoid network and so on. To test for non-linearity in a time series, the BDS test (Brock-Dechert-Scheinkman test) developed for econometrics can be used.
