= Hjorth parameters =

Statistical indicators in signal processing

Hjorth parameters are indicators of statistical properties used in signal processing in the time domain introduced by Bo Hjorth in 1970. The parameters are Activity, Mobility, and Complexity. They are commonly used in the analysis of electroencephalography signals for feature extraction. The parameters are normalised slope descriptors (NSDs) used in EEG. Moreover, in the robotic area, the Hjorth parameters are used for tactile signal processing for the physical object properties detection such as surface textures/material detection and touch modality classification via artificial robotic skin.

== Parameters ==
=== Hjorth Activity ===
In the activity parameter represents the signal power, the variance of a time function. This can indicate the surface of power spectrum in the frequency domain. This is represented by the following equation:

$$\text{Activity}  =  \text{var}(y(t)).$$

Where y(t) represents the signal.

=== Hjorth Mobility ===
The mobility parameter represents the mean frequency or the proportion of standard deviation of the power spectrum. This is defined as the square root of variance of the first derivative of the signal y(t) divided by variance of the signal y(t).

$$\text{Mobility} =\sqrt\frac{{\text{var}(\frac{dy(t)}{dt})}}{\text{var}(y(t))}.$$

=== Hjorth Complexity ===
The Complexity parameter represents the change in frequency. The parameter compares the signal's similarity to a pure sine wave, where the value converges to 1 if the signal is more similar.

$$\text{Complexity} =\frac{{\text{Mobility}(\frac{dy(t)}{dt})}}{\text{Mobility}(y(t))}.$$

== Tactile Signal Analysis ==
In the earlier works, researchers employed the Fourier transform technique to interpret the obtained tactile information for texture classification. However, the Fourier transform is not appropriate for analysing non-stationary signals in which textures are irregular or non-uniform. Short time Fourier transform or Wavelet might be the most appropriate techniques to analyse non-stationary signals. However, these methods deal with a large number of data points, thereby causing difficulties at the classification step. More features require more training samples resulting in the growth of the computational complexity as well as the risk of over-fitting. To overcome these issues Kaboli et al. proposed a set of fundamental tactile descriptor inspired by Hjorth parameters. Although Hjorth parameters are defined in the time domain, they can be interpreted in the frequency domain as well. The Activity parameter is the total power of the signal. It is also the surface of the power spectrum in the frequency domain (Parseval's theorem). The Mobility parameter is determined as the square root of the ratio of the variance of the first derivative of the signal to that of the signal. This parameter is proportional to a standard deviation of the power spectrum. It is an estimate of the mean frequency. Complexity gives an estimate of the bandwidth of the signal, which indicates the similarity of the shape of the signal to a pure sine wave. Since the calculation of the Hjorth parameters is based on variance, the computational cost of this method is sufficiently low, which makes them appropriate for the real-time task.
