= Detrended fluctuation analysis =

Method to detect power-law scaling in time series

In stochastic processes, chaos theory and time series analysis, detrended fluctuation analysis (DFA) is a method for determining the statistical self-affinity of a signal. It is useful for analysing time series that appear to be long-memory processes (diverging correlation time, e.g. power-law decaying autocorrelation function) or 1/f noise.

The obtained exponent is similar to the Hurst exponent, except that DFA may also be applied to signals whose underlying statistics (such as mean and variance) or dynamics are non-stationary (changing with time). It is related to measures based upon spectral techniques such as autocorrelation and Fourier transform.

Peng et al. introduced DFA in 1994 in a paper that has been cited over 3,000 times as of 2022 and represents an extension of the (ordinary) fluctuation analysis (FA), which is affected by non-stationarities.

Systematic studies of the advantages and limitations of the DFA method were performed by PCh Ivanov et al. in a series of papers focusing on the effects of different types of nonstationarities in real-world signals: (1) types of trends; (2) random outliers/spikes, noisy segments, signals composed of parts with different correlation; (3) nonlinear filters; (4) missing data; (5) signal coarse-graining procedures and comparing DFA performance with moving average techniques (cumulative citations > 4,000). Datasets generated to test DFA are available on PhysioNet.

== Definition ==
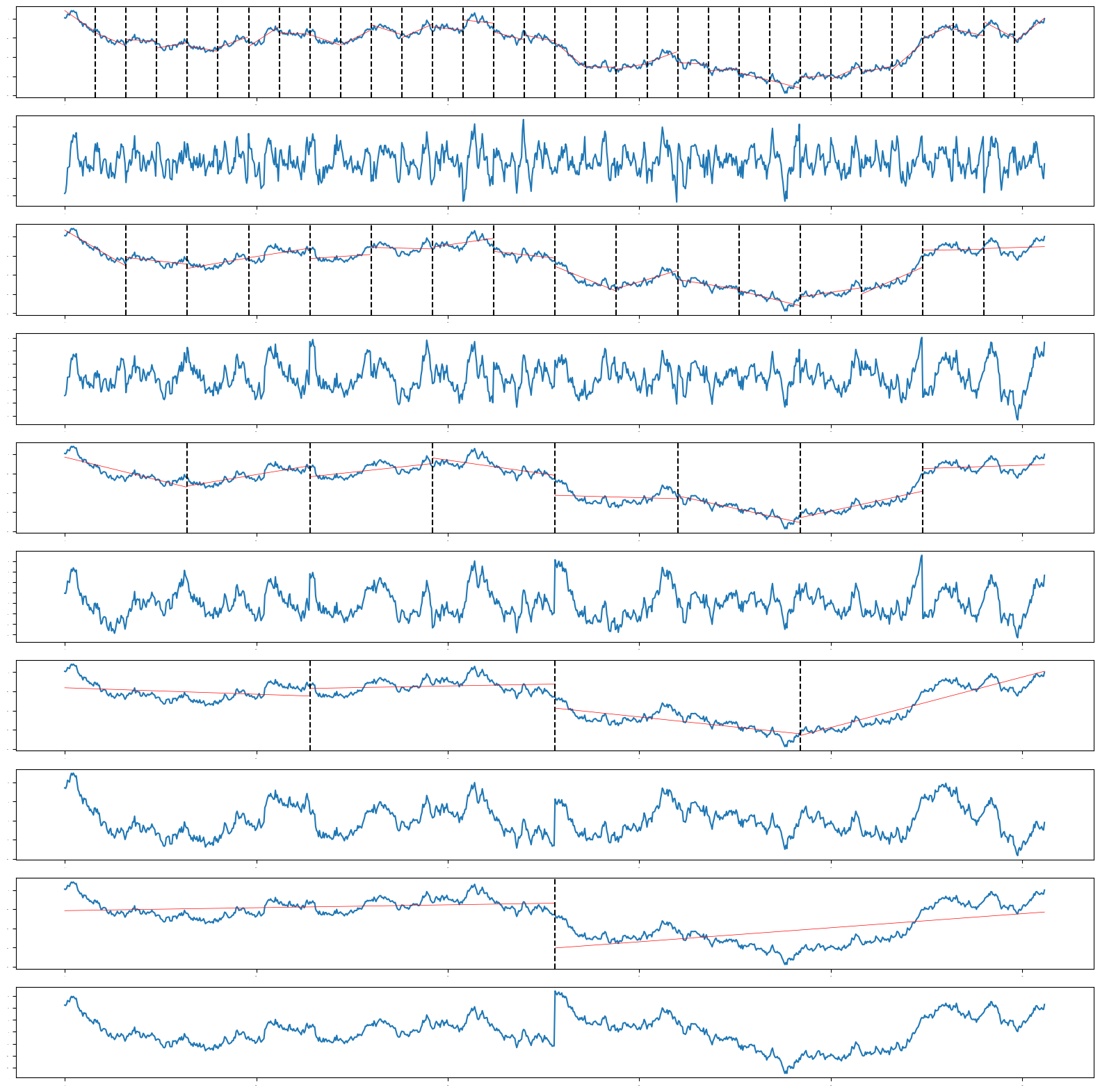
DFA on a Brownian motion process, with increasing values of $n$

=== Algorithm ===
Given: a time series $x_1, x_2, ..., x_N$.

Compute its average value $\langle x\rangle = \frac 1N \sum_{t=1}^N x_t$.

Sum it into a process $X_t=\sum_{i=1}^t (x_i-\langle x\rangle)$. This is the cumulative sum, or profile, of the original time series. For example, the profile of an i.i.d. white noise is a standard random walk.

Select a set $T = \{n_1, ..., n_k\}$ of integers, such that $n_1 < n_2 < \cdots < n_k$, the smallest $n_1 \approx 4$, the largest $n_k \approx N/4<ref></ref>$, and the sequence is roughly distributed evenly in log-scale: $\log(n_2) - \log(n_1) \approx \log(n_3) - \log(n_2) \approx \cdots$. In other words, it is approximately a geometric progression.

For each $n \in T$, divide the sequence $X_t$ into consecutive segments of length $n$. Within each segment, compute the least squares straight-line fit (the local trend). Let $Y_{1,n}, Y_{2,n}, ..., Y_{N,n}$ be the resulting piecewise-linear fit.

Compute the root-mean-square deviation from the local trend (local fluctuation):
$$F( n, i) = \sqrt{\frac{1}{n}\sum_{t = in+1}^{in+n} \left( X_t - Y_{t, n} \right)^2}.$$
And their root-mean-square is the total fluctuation:

$$F( n ) = \sqrt{\frac{1}{N/n}\sum_{i = 1}^{N/n} F(n, i)^2}.$$

(If $N$ is not divisible by $n$, then one can either discard the remainder of the sequence, or repeat the procedure on the reversed sequence, then take their root-mean-square.)

Make the log-log plot $\log n - \log F(n)$.

=== Interpretation ===
A straight line of slope $\alpha$ on the log-log plot indicates a statistical self-affinity of form $F(n) \propto n^{\alpha}$. Since $F(n)$ monotonically increases with $n$, we always have $\alpha > 0$.

The scaling exponent $\alpha$ is a generalization of the Hurst exponent, with the precise value giving information about the series self-correlations:

- $\alpha<1/2$: anti-correlated
- $\alpha \simeq 1/2$: uncorrelated, white noise
- $\alpha>1/2$: correlated
- $\alpha\simeq 1$: 1/f-noise, pink noise
- $\alpha>1$: non-stationary, unbounded
- $\alpha\simeq 3/2$: Brownian noise

Because the expected displacement in an uncorrelated random walk of length N grows like $\sqrt{N}$, an exponent of $\tfrac{1}{2}$ would correspond to uncorrelated white noise. When the exponent is between 0 and 1, the result is fractional Gaussian noise.

=== Pitfalls in interpretation ===
Though the DFA algorithm always produces a positive number $\alpha$ for any time series, it does not necessarily imply that the time series is self-similar. Self-similarity requires the log-log graph to be sufficiently linear over a wide range of $n$. Furthermore, a combination of techniques including maximum likelihood estimation (MLE), rather than least-squares has been shown to better approximate the scaling, or power-law, exponent.

Also, there are many scaling exponent-like quantities that can be measured for a self-similar time series, including the divider dimension and Hurst exponent. Therefore, the DFA scaling exponent $\alpha$ is not a fractal dimension, and does not have certain desirable properties that the Hausdorff dimension has, though in certain special cases it is related to the box-counting dimension for the graph of a time series.

== Generalizations ==
=== Generalization to polynomial trends (higher order DFA) ===
The standard DFA algorithm given above removes a linear trend in each segment. If we remove a degree-n polynomial trend in each segment, it is called DFAn, or higher order DFA.

Since $X_t$ is a cumulative sum of $x_t-\langle x\rangle$, a linear trend in $X_t$ is a constant trend in $x_t-\langle x\rangle$, which is a constant trend in $x_t$ (visible as short sections of "flat plateaus"). In this regard, DFA1 removes the mean from segments of the time series $x_t$ before quantifying the fluctuation.

Similarly, a degree n trend in $X_t$ is a degree (n-1) trend in $x_t$. For example, DFA1 removes linear trends from segments of the time series $x_t$ before quantifying the fluctuation, DFA1 removes parabolic trends from $x_t$, and so on.

The Hurst R/S analysis removes constant trends in the original sequence and thus, in its detrending it is equivalent to DFA1.

=== Generalization to different moments (multifractal DFA) ===
DFA can be generalized by computing
$$F_q( n ) = \left(\frac{1}{N/n}\sum_{i = 1}^{N/n} F(n, i)^q\right)^{1/q}$$
then making the log-log plot of $\log n - \log F_q(n)$, If there is a strong linearity in the plot of $\log n - \log F_q(n)$, then that slope is $\alpha(q)$. DFA is the special case where $q=2$.

Multifractal systems scale as a function $F_q(n) \propto n^{\alpha(q)}$. Essentially, the scaling exponents need not be independent of the scale of the system. In particular, DFA measures the scaling-behavior of the second moment-fluctuations.

Kantelhardt et al. intended this scaling exponent as a generalization of the classical Hurst exponent. The classical Hurst exponent corresponds to $H=\alpha(2)$ for stationary cases, and $H=\alpha(2)-1$ for nonstationary cases.

== Applications ==
The DFA method has been applied to many systems, e.g. DNA sequences; heartbeat dynamics in sleep and wake, sleep stages, rest and exercise, and across circadian phases; locomotor gate and wrist dynamics, neuronal oscillations, speech pathology detection, and animal behavior pattern analysis.

== Relations to other methods, for specific types of signal ==
=== For signals with power-law-decaying autocorrelation ===
In the case of power-law decaying auto-correlations, the correlation function decays with an exponent $\gamma$: $C(L)\sim L^{-\gamma}\!\$. In addition the power spectrum decays as $P(f)\sim f^{-\beta}\!\$. The three exponents are related by:

- $\gamma=2-2\alpha$
- $\beta=2\alpha-1$ and
- $\gamma=1-\beta$.

The relations can be derived using the Wiener–Khinchin theorem. The relation of DFA to the power spectrum method has been well studied.

Thus, $\alpha$ is tied to the slope of the power spectrum $\beta$ and is used to describe the color of noise by this relationship: $\alpha = (\beta+1)/2$.

=== For fractional Gaussian noise ===
For fractional Gaussian noise (FGN), we have $\beta \in [-1,1]$, and thus $\alpha \in [0,1]$, and $\beta = 2H-1$, where $H$ is the Hurst exponent. $\alpha$ for FGN is equal to $H$.

=== For fractional Brownian motion ===
For fractional Brownian motion (FBM), we have $\beta \in [1,3]$, and thus $\alpha \in [1,2]$, and $\beta = 2H+1$, where $H$ is the Hurst exponent. $\alpha$ for FBM is equal to $H+1$. In this context, FBM is the cumulative sum or the integral of FGN, thus, the exponents of their power spectra differ by 2.

== See also ==
- Multifractal system – System with multiple fractal dimensions
- Self-organized criticality – Concept in physics
- Self-affinity – Whole of an object being mathematically similar to part of itself
- Time series analysis – Sequence of data points over time
- Hurst exponent – Measure of the long-range dependence of a time series
