= Hartmut =

Hartmut is a German masculine given name. Notable people with the name include:

- Hartmut of Saint Gall (died 905), Benedictine abbot
- Hartmut Bagger (1938–2024), German general of the Bundeswehr
- Hartmut Becker (1938–2022), German actor
- Hartmut Boockmann (1934–1998), German historian and researcher in medieval history
- Hartmut Briesenick (1949–2013), East German athlete, mainly men's shot put
- Hartmut Büttner, German politician (German Christian Democratic Union)
- Hartmut Elsenhans (born 1941), German political scientist, professor at the Universität Leipzig
- Hartmut Erbse (1915–2004), German classical philologist
- Hartmut Esslinger (born 1944), German-American industrial designer
- Hartmut Fähndrich (born 1944), German-Arabic translator
- Hartmut Faust (born 1965), West German sprint canoeist
- Hartmut Fromm (born 1950), retired German football defender
- Hartmut Geerken (1939–2021), German musician, composer, writer, journalist, playwright, and filmmaker
- Hartmut Gründler (1930–1977), German teacher who burned himself out of protest
- Hartmut Haenchen (born 1943), German orchestra conductor
- Hartmut Heidemann (1941–2022), retired German football player
- Hartmut Heinrich (born 1952), German marine geologist and climatologist
- Hartmut Honka, German politician (German Christian Democratic Union)
- Hartmut Jahreiß, German astronomer associated with Astronomisches Rechen-Institut
- Hartmut Jürgens (1955–2017), German mathematician
- Hartmut Kallmann (1896–1978), German physicist
- Hartmut Keyler (1936–2025), German architect and World Scout Committee member
- Hartmut Konschal (born 1953), German football coach and a former player
- Hartmut Krüger (born 1953), former East German handball player
- Hartmut Lutz, professor of American and Canadian studies at the University of Greifswald, Germany
- Hartmut Mehdorn (born 1942), German manager and former CEO of Deutsche Bahn AG
- Hartmut Michel, German biochemist and Nobel Laureate
- Hartmut Möllring, German politician (German Christian Democratic Union)
- Hartmut Nassauer (born 1942), German politician and Member of the European Parliament for Hesse
- Hartmut Neugebauer (1941–2017), German actor, voice actor and dialogue director from Poznań, Poland
- Hartmut Neven (born 1964), scientist working in computational neurobiology, robotics and computer vision
- Hartmut Ostrowski (born 1958), CEO of Bertelsmann AG
- Hartmut Pilch (born 1963), founded the Foundation for a Free Information Infrastructure or FFII
- Hartmut Ritzerfeld (1950–2024), German painter
- Hartmut Schade (born 1954), former football player, who won the 1976 Summer Olympics
- Hartmut Schairer (1916–1942), highly decorated Hauptmann in the Luftwaffe during World War II
- Hartmut Schreiber (born 1944), German rower
- Hartmut Stegemann (1933–2005), German theologian, specialized in Dead Sea Scrolls research
- Hartmut Surmann (born 1963), Senior Researcher and Scientist at the IAIS
- Hartmut Weber (born 1960), retired West German sprinter who specialized in the 400 metres
- Hartmut Wekerle (born 1944), German medical scientist and neurobiologist
- Hartmut Wenzel (1947–2020), German rower
- Hartmut Winkler (born 1953), Professor at the University of Paderborn in Germany
- Hartmut Zinser (born 1944), German scholar in religious studies, history of religions, and ethnology

== Other uses ==
- Operationsbefehl Hartmut the code word for initiating German submarine operations during Operation Weserübung
- 2018 British Isles cold wave, also known as Anticyclone Hartmut

== See also ==
- 1531 Hartmut (1938 SH), a Main-belt Asteroid discovered in 1938
