= Harold Edwin Hurst =

British hydrologist (1880–1978)

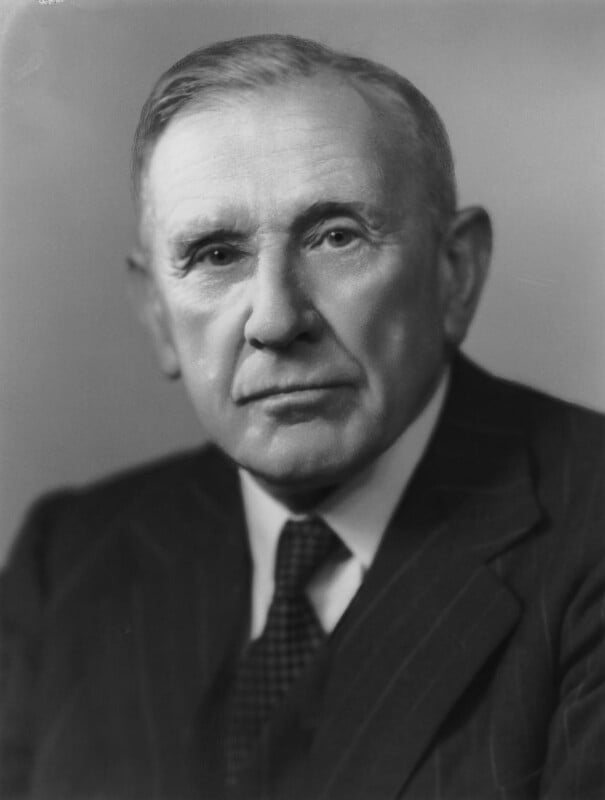
Hurst in 1953

Harold Edwin Hurst (1 January 1880 – 7 December 1978) was a British hydrologist from Leicester. Hurst's (1951) study on measuring the long-term storage capacity of reservoirs documented the presence of long-range dependence in hydrology, especially concerning the fluctuations of the water level in the Nile River. In doing so, he developed the empirical rescaled range methodology for measuring long-range dependence. Much of Hurst's research was motivated by his empirical observations of the Nile. The Hurst exponent, which has been used in other fields, such as finance and cardiology, was named after him.

His work in Egypt started in 1906 and lasted 62 years doing his best work after he reached 65. He championed the prelude to the new Aswan High Dam project which was built using his plan.
