= Saupe =

Saupe is a surname. Notable people with the surname include:

- Alfred Saupe (1925–2008), German physicist
- Dietmar Saupe (born 1954), German academic
