= Murad Taqqu =

American mathematician (1942–2026)

Murad Salman Taqqu (Arabic: مراد طقو; 1942 – April 28, 2026) was an American mathematician best known for his pioneering research in the field of self-similar stochastic processes and their applications. His work established the mathematical foundation of modern internet traffic, informing generations of researchers and engineers to design protocols, applications, and systems to handle network traffic based on the patterns that Taqqu modeled. This research built on the work of his thesis advisor and mentor Benoit Mandelbrot, widely recognized as the “father of fractals.” Taqqu also made many contributions to the mathematical modeling of real-world phenomena such as long-range dependence and heavy tails.

== Life and career ==
Taqqu was born in Baghdad, Iraq but grew up in Switzerland. As an undergraduate, he studied physics and mathematics at the École Polytechnique Fédérale de Lausanne. He obtained his Ph.D. at Columbia University in 1972, with his dissertation Limit Theorems for Sums of Strongly Dependent Random Variables supervised by Benoit Mandelbrot. Between 1972 and 1974 Taqqu lectured at the Hebrew University of Jerusalem and worked as a post-doctoral fellow at the Weizmann Institute in Rehovot. From 1974 to 1985, he was a faculty member at the School of Operations Research and Industrial Engineering at Cornell University. Since 1985, Taqqu has served as a professor in the Department of Mathematics and Statistics at Boston University, where he is professor emeritus.

He published over 250 papers, and co-authored or co-edited 11 books. Taqqu died on April 28, 2026, at the age of 84.

== Research impact ==
Prior to the expansion of the modern internet in the 1990s, a long-held view was that packet-level internet traffic behaves like conventional telephone network traffic: aggregating the traffic from many users over longer periods of time will smooth out any bursts and produce a highly predictable and smooth dynamics (i.e, Poisson process), much like how a crowded stadium sounds like a steady hum rather than individual shouts. Taqqu’s 1993 work, in collaboration with Walter Willinger and his colleagues Will Leland and Dan Wilson from Bellcore, pioneered the statistical analysis of measured packet-level internet traffic; this demonstrated that real-world network traffic is in fact self-similar, or fractal, meaning that it remains bursty and unpredictable whether viewed at time scales of milliseconds, seconds, minute, or hours. This mathematical framework for understanding the nature of modern internet traffic underpins most system designs for the modern internet. Today’s video streaming applications, for example, perform efficiently due in large parts to these mathematical discoveries. The protocols that are used by today’s most popular applications and that dictate the flow of traffic were explicitly or implicitly designed to deal with the internet traffic’s “fractal" nature identified in Taqqu’s seminal research.

Taqqu’s work on long-range dependence also saw applications in the areas of hydrology (modeling river-level variability, rainfall data, etc.), the analysis of the structure of DNA sequences, and finance. For example, when modeling stock market prices, long-range dependence challenges the Efficient Market Hypothesis by suggesting that past returns can have a persistent, though decaying, influence on future prices over long horizons. While Benoit Mandelbrot originally considered long-range dependence and fractal scaling behavior in finance, Taqqu’s research provided the mathematical scaffolding needed to rigorously establish these properties, propose suitable mathematical models, and develop statistical techniques for inferring and estimating the models’ parameters.

== Honors and awards ==
- Taqqu was named a Guggenheim Fellow in 1987.
- Taqqu's 1995 paper "On the Self-Similar Nature of Ethernet Traffic," co-authored with Will Leland, Walter Willinger, and Dan Wilson, won the William J. Bennett Award from the IEEE Communications Society.
- The same group was awarded the IEEE W.R.G. Baker Prize Paper Award in 1996.
- The same four co-authors were recognized again, 11 years after the original publication, with the ACM/SIGCOMM Test of Time Award.
- Taqqu's 2000 paper "Meaningful MRA initialization for discrete time series," co-authored with D. Veitch and P Abry, was named the best paper in signal processing by EURASIP.
- He was included in the 2019 class of fellows of the American Mathematical Society "for contributions to self-similar random processes and their applications to real world phenomena such as diverse internet traffic and hydrology".

== Selected books ==
Author

- Stable Non-Gaussian Random Processes: Stochastic Models with Infinite Variance. Gennady Samorodnitsky and Murad S. Taqqu, ISBN 0-412-05171-0, Chapman and Hall, New York (1994).
- Wiener Chaos: Moments, Cumulants and Diagrams: A survey with Computer Implementation. Giovanni Peccati and Murad S. Taqqu. ISBN 88-470-1678-9. Springer, (2011).

Editor

- New Directions in Time Series Analysis, Part I. D. Brillinger, P. Caines, J. Geweke, E. Parzen, M. Rosenblatt and M.S. Taqqu, editors. "The IMA Volumes in Mathematics and its Applications". Series. Vol. 45. ISBN 0-387-97896-8. Springer Verlag, New York, (1992).
- New Directions in Time Series Analysis, Part II. D. Brillinger, P. Caines, J. Geweke, E. Parzen, M. Rosenblatt and M.S. Taqqu, editors. "The IMA Volumes in Mathematics and its Applications". Series. Vol. 46. ISBN 0-387-97914-X. Springer Verlag, New York, (1992).
- Stochastic Processes and Related Topics: In memory of Stamatis Cambanis 1943–1995. Ioannis Karatzas, Balram S. Rajput, Murad S. Taqqu, editors. Trends in Mathematics Series. ISBN 3-7643-3998-5. Birkhäuser, Boston (1998).
- A Practical Guide to Heavy Tails: Statistical Techniques and Applications. Robert J. Adler, Raisa E. Feldman and Murad S. Taqqu, editors. ISBN 0-8176-3951-9. Birkhäuser, Boston (1998).
- Theory and Applications of Long-Range Dependence. Paul Doukhan, Georges Oppenheim and Murad S.Taqqu, editors. ISBN 0-8176-4168-8. Birkhäuser, Boston (2003).
