= Morhange (disambiguation) =

Morhange is a commune in the Moselle department in Lorraine, in north-eastern France.

Morhange may also refer to:

== Surname ==
- Charles-Valentin Alkan (originally Morhange), French composer and pianist
- Françoise Morhange, a French actress who starred in Le Voyage en douce
- Zina Morhange (1909–1987), a Polish-born French physician and member of the French Resistance

== Other uses ==
- Réseau Morhange ("Morhange network"), a French resistance group created in 1943
- Battle of Morhange, in August 1914 during World War I, one of the Battle of the Frontiers
