= Edgar E. Peters =

American asset manager & writer (born 1952)

Edgar E. Peters (born July 16, 1952), is an asset manager and writer on investment management topics. He is noted for his early contributions to the application of chaos theory and fractals to the financial markets. These works primarily dealt with fat tailed distributions originally discovered by Benoit Mandelbrot and expanded upon in Peters (1991 and 1994). These probability distributions are considered fractal because they are self-similar over different investment horizons once adjusted for scale.

Peters worked as an asset manager for PanAgora Asset Management, Inc., during which time he researched rescaled range analysis, and attempted to estimate the Hurst exponent of various financial markets. He has also taught at Babson College, Boston College and Bentley College, and contributed papers to the Journal of Portfolio Management and the Financial Analysts Journal. His current venture is "Fractal Market Cycles and Regimes" at www.edgarepeters.com.

His books include Chaos and Order in the Capital Markets (According to WorldCat, the book is held in 813 libraries,) Fractal Market Analysis (held in 580 libraries) and Patterns in the Dark: Understanding Risk and Financial Crisis with Complexity Theory. According to Google Scholar his books and articles have over 6000 references.

The fractal market hypothesis (FMH) was proposed by Peters (1994). That hypothesis suggests that financial markets are stable and efficient when participants have diverse investment horizons, that that prices reflect the interplay of these horizons, and market instability arises when short-term investors dominate and disrupt that balance.

Recent research has supported the FMH as well describing the 2008 financial crisis as well as Tech Bubble of 2000. The FMH is a model of investor behavior that unlike the efficient-market hypothesis assumes investors have multiple time horizons and interpret information based upon their horizon.

More recently he has contributed to the risk parity literature.
