= Michael Frame =

American mathematician (born 1951)

Michael Frame is an American mathematician and retired Yale University professor. He is a co-author, along with Amelia Urry, of Fractal Worlds: Grown, Built, and Imagined. At Yale, he was a colleague of Benoit Mandelbrot and helped Mandelbrot develop a curriculum within the mathematics department.

== Early years and education ==
Michael Frame was born in 1951 and grew up in St. Albans, West Virginia. After leaving his physics major because the lab requirement was "something in biophysics with killing frogs," Frame, a vegetarian, received a bachelor's degree in mathematics at Union College as a first-generation college student. In 1978, he completed a PhD in mathematics at Tulane University.

== Teaching career ==
Michael Frame came to work at Yale University at the invitation of his colleague Benoit Mandelbrot. At Yale, Frame called himself "the stupidest guy in the department...the dimmest bulb in the pack here," and focused on his teaching contributions. He received the McCredie Prize for best use of technology in teaching at Yale College, the Dylan Hixon '88 Prize for teaching excellence in the natural sciences, and the Yale Phi Beta Kappa chapter's DeVane medal for undergraduate teaching.

== Work with Mandelbrot ==
Benoit Mandelbrot includes a section on Michael Frame in his posthumously published autobiography The Fractalist: Memoir of a Scientific Maverick. In the section, called "Michael Frame, Friend and Colleague," he calls Frame an "indispensable" professor.

In 1997, Mandelbrot and Frame held a meeting of teachers of fractal geometry. According to Mandelbrot, as far as he knew, this was the "first scientific meeting totally dedicated to the teaching of fractals. This eventually culminated in the 2002 publication of the book Fractals, Graphics, and Mathematics Education, which was co-authored by Frame and Mandelbrot.
