= Self-similar process =

Self-similar processes are stochastic processes satisfying a mathematically precise version of the self-similarity property. Several related properties have this name, and some are defined here.

A self-similar phenomenon behaves the same when viewed at different degrees of magnification, or different scales on a dimension. Because stochastic processes are random variables with a time and a space component, their self-similarity properties are defined in terms of how a scaling in time relates to a scaling in space.

== Distributional self-similarity ==
A plot of $(1/\sqrt c) W_{ct}$ for $W$ a Brownian motion and c decreasing, demonstrating the self-similarity with parameter $H=1/2$.

=== Definition ===
A continuous-time stochastic process $(X_t)_{t\ge0}$ is called self-similar with parameter $H>0$ if for all $a>0$, the processes $(X_{at})_{t\ge0}$ and $(a^HX_t)_{t\ge0}$ have the same law.

=== Examples ===
- The Wiener process (or Brownian motion) is self-similar with $H=1/2$.
- The fractional Brownian motion is a generalisation of Brownian motion that preserves self-similarity; it can be self-similar for any $H\in(0,1)$.
- The class of self-similar Lévy processes are called stable processes. They can be self-similar for any $H\in[1/2,\infty)$.

== Second-order self-similarity ==
=== Definition ===
A wide-sense stationary process $(X_n)_{n\ge0}$ is called exactly second-order self-similar with parameter $H>0$ if the following hold:

(i) $\mathrm{Var}(X^{(m)})=\mathrm{Var}(X)m^{2(H-1)}$, where for each $k\in\mathbb N_0$, $X^{(m)}_k = \frac 1 m \sum_{i=1}^m X_{(k-1)m + i},$
(ii) for all $m\in\mathbb N^+$, the autocorrelation functions $r$ and $r^{(m)}$ of $X$ and $X^{(m)}$ are equal.

If instead of (ii), the weaker condition

(iii) $r^{(m)} \to r$ pointwise as $m\to\infty$

holds, then $X$ is called asymptotically second-order self-similar.

=== Connection to long-range dependence ===
In the case $1/2<H<1$, asymptotic self-similarity is equivalent to long-range dependence. Self-similar and long-range dependent characteristics in computer networks present a fundamentally different set of problems to people doing analysis and/or design of networks, and many of the previous assumptions upon which systems have been built are no longer valid in the presence of self-similarity.

Long-range dependence is closely connected to the theory of heavy-tailed distributions. A distribution is said to have a heavy tail if

$$\lim_{x \to \infty} e^{\lambda x}\Pr[X>x] = \infty \quad \mbox{for all } \lambda>0.\,$$

One example of a heavy-tailed distribution is the Pareto distribution. Examples of processes that can be described using heavy-tailed distributions include traffic processes, such as packet inter-arrival times and burst lengths.

=== Examples ===
- The Tweedie convergence theorem can be used to explain the origin of the variance to mean power law, 1/f noise and multifractality, features associated with self-similar processes.
- Ethernet traffic data is often self-similar. Empirical studies of measured traffic traces have led to the wide recognition of self-similarity in network traffic.
