= The Fractal Geometry of Nature =

Book by Benoît Mandelbrot

- Cover of the hardcover edition
- Author: Benoît Mandelbrot
- Language: English
- Subject: Mathematics
- Publisher: W. H. Freeman and Co.
- Publication date: 1982
- Publication place: United States
- Media type: Print
- ISBN: 0-7167-1186-9

The Fractal Geometry of Nature is a 1982 book by the Franco-American mathematician Benoît Mandelbrot.

== Overview ==
The Fractal Geometry of Nature is a revised and enlarged version of his 1977 book entitled Fractals: Form, Chance and Dimension, which in turn was a revised, enlarged, and translated version of his 1975 French book, Les Objets Fractals: Forme, Hasard et Dimension. American Scientist put the book in its one hundred books of 20th century science.

As technology has improved, mathematically accurate, computer-drawn fractals have become more detailed. Early drawings were low-resolution black and white; later drawings were higher resolution and in color. Many examples were created by programmers working with Mandelbrot, primarily at IBM Research. These visualizations have added to persuasiveness of the books and their impact on the scientific community.

== See also ==
- Chaos theory
