= Hartmut Honka =

German politician

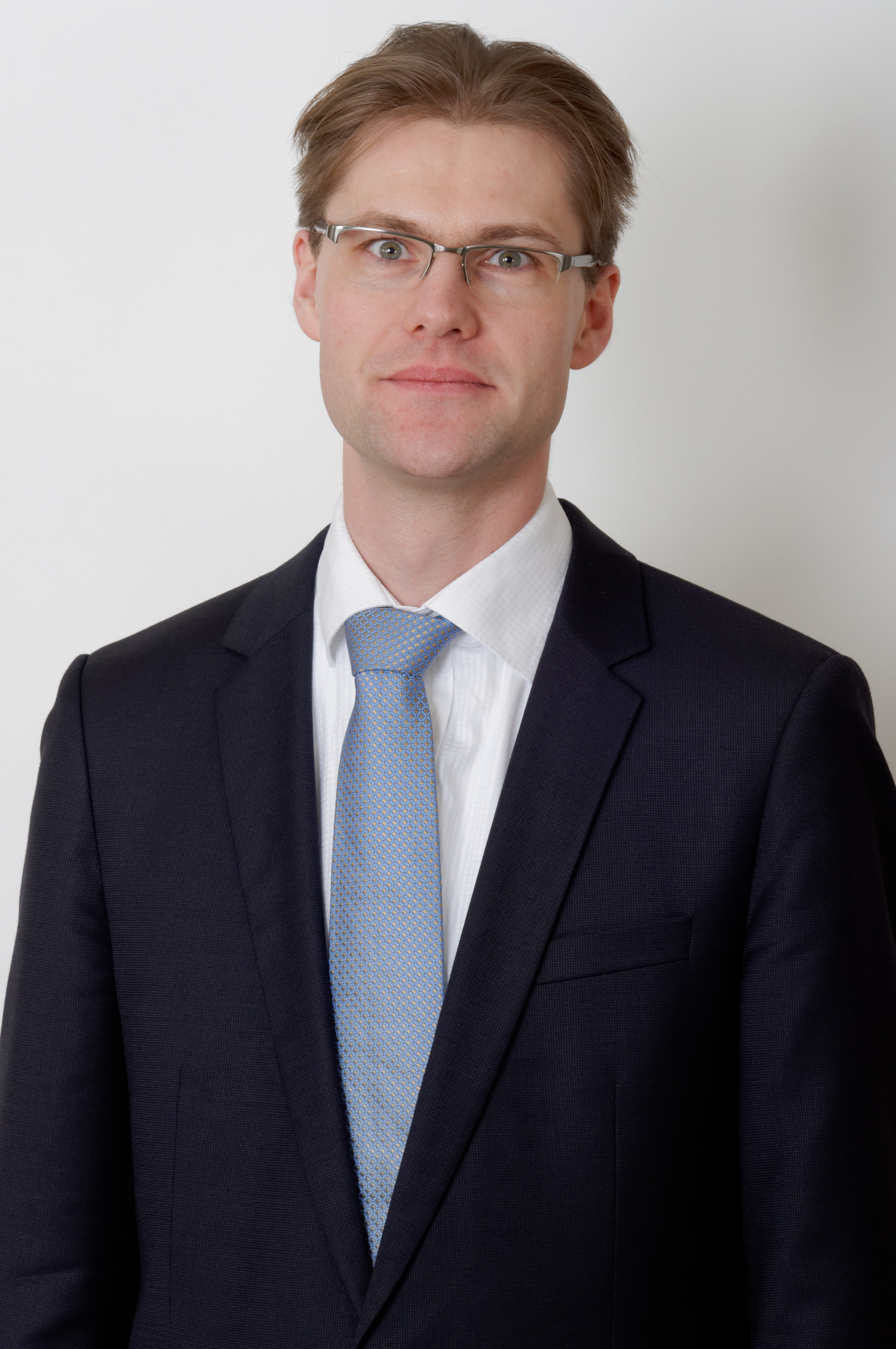

Personal details
- Born: 11 May 1978 (age 48) Frankfurt am Main, West Germany
- Party: CDU

Hartmut Honka (born 11 May 1978 in Frankfurt am Main) is a German conservative politician and Member of Parliament in the Landtag of Hesse.

== Life ==
After graduation in 1997 at the Goethe School Neu-Isenburg and the civil service Hartmut Honka studied at the Johann Wolfgang Goethe University in Frankfurt am Main. He was 2006-2008 law clerk in the area of the District Court Frankfurt am Main. In December 2008, he passed his Second State Examination . In 2010, he completed additional training as a mediator (DAA). He has worked as a lawyer in Dreieich.

Since 1996, Hartmut Honka is a member of the Christian Democratic Union and the Young Union. In September 1998, he was in the city council of Neu-Isenburg. Since the local election in 2001 he was a member of the Committee on construction, planning, environment and transport. After his move he resigned in March 2006 for the CDU Dreieich and was able to win a seat in the local city council. From February 2008 to March 2011, he was chairman of the Finance Committee of the City of Dreieich. Since November 2009, he has been chairman of the CDU Urban Community Dreieich. Since the local elections in March 2011, he is also Chairman of the CDU faction in the city council of the City Council of Dreieich.

On 30 October 2006, he moved according to the Hesse state parliament for the resigned member Rüdiger Hermann. He represents the constituency of 44 (Offenbach country I). This includes the cities of Dreieich, Langen (Hessen) and Neu-Isenburg and the community Egelsbach. In the parliamentary elections on 27 January 2008, he won the direct mandate with 40.7% of votes. At the election on 18 January 2009, he defended his direct mandate with 43.3% of votes. In the parliamentary elections on 22 September 2013 he has won the direct mandate in his constituency with 43.8% for the third year in a row.

For the 18 Legislature, he was elected again to the right Polti's Spokesman of the CDU parliamentary group. He is a member of the Law and Integration Committee, the Budget Committee, the Subcommittee on Correctional Policy and the Subcommittee on Judicial Appointments Committee. He is also another deputy member of the Main Committee. The committee of inquiry 18/1, he belonged to a full member and the Committee of Inquiry 18/2 as a deputy member.

In the 17th Legislature ( 5 April to 19 November 2008) he was elected right political spokesman of the CDU parliamentary group . He was a member of the Legal Committee, the Budget Committee, the Sub-Committee on Penal and another deputy member of the Main Committee .

In the 16th Parliament, he was a regular member of the Committee on Economic Affairs and Transport, Committee on Petitions, in the case of hardship Commission and the Committee of Inquiry 16 /3 System. Furthermore, he was a deputy member of the committee of inquiry 16/2 .

Since early November 2011, he is state chairman of the working group of Christian Democratic lawyers Hesse (LACDJ) .

== Family ==
Hartmut Honka is Catholic, married and has two children. The family lives in Dreieich-Sprendlingen.
