= Dietmar Saupe =

German computer scientist (born 1954)

Dietmar Saupe (born 1954) is a German fractal researcher and professor of computer science, Department of Computer and Information Science, University of Konstanz, Germany.

Saupe's book, Chaos and Fractals, won the Association of American Publishers award for Best Mathematics Book of the Year in 1992. His current research interests include computer graphics, scientific visualization, and image processing.
