= Zina Morhange =

French physician (1909–1987)

Zenaida Paley, better known as Zina Morhange (1 June 1909 – 1 October 1987) was a Polish-born French physician and a member of the French Resistance during the Second World War.

== Early life ==
She was born in Łódź, into a Jewish family. They emigrated to France, where she married Jean Morhange, a Jewish doctor who was two years her elder, and they settled at Chamberet. At the outbreak of war, they joined the Resistance together, but Jean was killed in a car accident in 1941. Jean's brother was Pierre Morhange, a poet, who survived the war.

== Auschwitz ==
Another doctor within the community, who was also the local mayor, is believed to have betrayed Zina Morhange to the Gestapo, and she was arrested on 8 April 1944. Her sister and mother managed to escape capture. Her seven-year-old daughter, Claude, was hidden by her schoolteachers and cared for by the village dressmaker, who also sheltered the other family members. Claude was obliged to pretend to be Catholic. On 29 April, Dr. Morhange was transported to Auschwitz concentration camp in convoy no 72; there she was assigned to Revier "hospital" and made to act as the examining doctor for prisoners about to be sent to the gas chamber; by making misleading diagnoses, she was able to save some lives. Among those she helped was Rose Warfman, for whom she procured painkillers.

== Post-war ==
Returning to Chamberet after thirteen months in concentration camps, Morhange was much altered physically and mentally. She shared her experiences with her daughter Claude, but felt unable to write her own account.

She later married Jo Saltiel, who died by suicide in 1972. Zina inherited the clothes shop he owned in Marseille, but did not wish to continue to run the business and returned to live in Paris.

== Legacy ==
Zina Morhange and her family are mentioned in Christophe Boltanski's 2015 novel, La Cache, based on the experiences of his grandfather, Etienne Boltanski. Her daughter, Claude Morhange-Bégué, wrote a book about her childhood experiences, which was published in English translation in 2000 under the title Chamberet: Recollections from an Ordinary Childhood.
