= Hartmut Jürgens =

German mathematician (1955–2017)

Hartmut Jürgens (March 17, 1955–September 23, 2017) was a German mathematician, born in Bremen, Germany. He received his doctorate in 1983 from the University of Bremen. He has worked in the computer industry, and was the Director of the Dynamical Systems Graphics Laboratory at the University of Bremen.

== Works ==
Jürgens is the co-author of:

- Fractals: An Animated Discussion (video)
- Fractals for the Classroom: Strategic Activities (in three volumes, National Council of Teachers of Mathematics)
- Chaos and Fractals: New Frontiers of Science (Springer-Verlag, 1992, ISBN 0-387-97903-4; 2nd ed., 2004)
