= Hildreth–Lu estimation =

Hildreth–Lu estimation, named for Clifford Hildreth and John Y. Lu, is a method for adjusting a linear model in response to the presence of serial correlation in the error term. It is an iterative procedure related to the Cochrane–Orcutt estimation.

The idea is to repeatedly apply ordinary least squares to

$$y_t - \rho y_{t-1} = \alpha(1-\rho)+(X_t - \rho X_{t-1})\beta + e_t \,$$

for different values of $\rho$ between −1 and 1. From all these auxiliary regressions, one selects the pair (α, β) that yields the smallest residual sum of squares.

== See also ==
- Prais–Winsten estimation
