= Leonid Hurwicz =

Polish–American economist and mathematician (1917–2008)

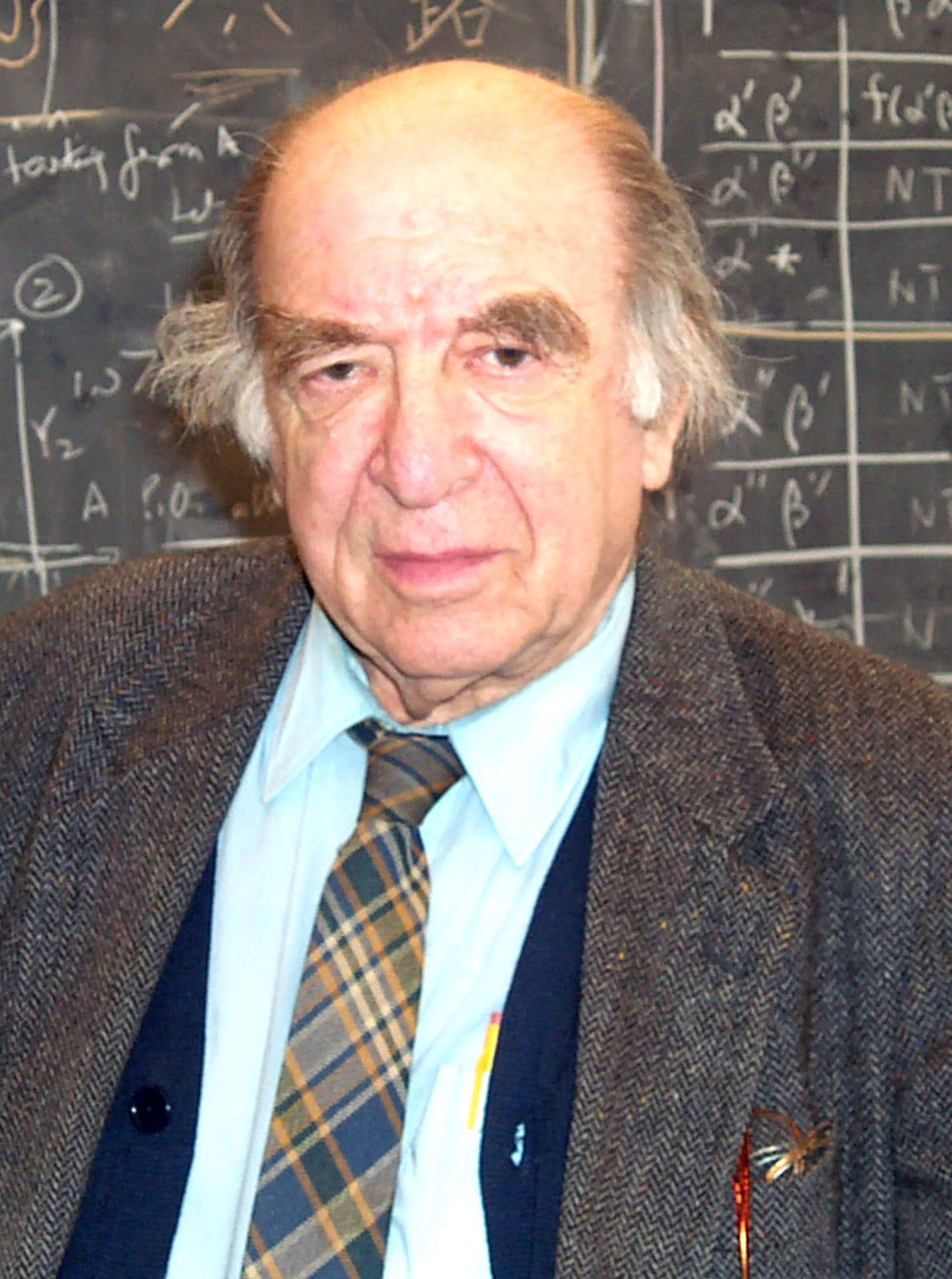
- Hurwicz in 2005
- Born: August 21, 1917; Moscow, Russia
- Died: June 24, 2008 (aged 90); Minneapolis, Minnesota, U.S.
- Citizenship: Poland; United States

Academic background
- Education: University of Warsaw; Graduate Institute of International Studies; London School of Economics
- Influences: Tjalling Koopmans; Jacob Marschak; Friedrich Hayek

Academic work
- Institutions: University of Minnesota; Iowa State College; Cowles Commission; University of Chicago
- Doctoral students: Clifford Hildreth; Stanley Reiter; Daniel McFadden; Richard B. McHugh; Leigh Tesfatsion; Myrna Wooders
- Notable ideas: Mechanism design
- Awards: National Medal of Science (1990); Nobel Memorial Prize (2007)
- Website: Information at IDEAS / RePEc

Leonid Hurwicz (Polish pronunciation: [lɛˈɔɲit ˈxurvitʂ]; August 21, 1917 – June 24, 2008) was a Polish–American economist and mathematician, known for his work in game theory and mechanism design. He originated the concept of incentive compatibility, and showed how desired outcomes can be achieved by using incentive compatible mechanism design. Hurwicz shared the 2007 Nobel Memorial Prize in Economic Sciences (with Eric Maskin and Roger Myerson) for his seminal work on mechanism design. Hurwicz was one of the oldest Nobel Laureates, having received the prize at the age of 90.

Hurwicz was educated and grew up in Poland, and became a refugee in the United States after Hitler invaded Poland in 1939. In 1941, Hurwicz worked as a research assistant for Paul Samuelson at the Massachusetts Institute of Technology and Oskar Lange at the University of Chicago. He was a research associate for the Cowles Commission between 1942 and 1946. In 1946 he became an associate professor of economics at Iowa State College. Hurwicz joined the University of Minnesota in 1951, becoming Regents' Professor of Economics in 1969, and Curtis L. Carlson Professor of Economics in 1989. He was Regents' Professor of Economics (Emeritus) at the University of Minnesota when he died in 2008.

Hurwicz was among the first economists to recognize the value of game theory and was a pioneer in its application. Interactions of individuals and institutions, markets and trade are analyzed and understood today using the models Hurwicz developed.

== Personal life ==
Hurwicz was born in Moscow, Russia, to a family of Polish Jews a few months before the October Revolution. Soon after Leonid's birth, the family returned to Warsaw. Hurwicz and his family experienced persecution by both the Bolsheviks and Nazis, as he again became a refugee when Germany invaded Poland in 1939. His parents and brother fled Warsaw, only to be arrested and sent to Soviet labor camps. Hurwicz, who had graduated from Warsaw University in 1938, at the time of Nazi invasion on Poland was in London, moved to Switzerland then to Portugal and finally in 1940 he emigrated to the United States. His family eventually joined him there.

Hurwicz hired Evelyn Jensen (born October 31, 1923), who grew up on a Wisconsin farm and was, at the time, an undergraduate in economics at the University of Chicago, as his teaching assistant during the 1940s. They married on July 19, 1944 and later lived at a number of locations in Minneapolis. They had four children: Sarah, Michael, Ruth and Maxim.

His interests included linguistics, archaeology, biochemistry and music. His activities outside the field of economics included research in meteorology and membership in the NSF Commission on Weather Modification. When Eugene McCarthy ran for president of the United States, Hurwicz served in 1968 as a McCarthy delegate from Minnesota to the Democratic Party Convention and a member of the Democratic Party Platform Committee. He helped design the 'walking subcaucus' method of allocating delegates among competing groups, which is still used today by political parties. He remained an active Democrat, and attended his precinct caucus in February 2008 at the age of 90.

He was hospitalized in mid-June 2008, suffering from renal failure. He died a week later in Minneapolis.

== Education and early academic career ==
Encouraged by his father to study law, in 1938 Hurwicz received his LL.M. degree from the University of Warsaw, where he discovered his future vocation in economics class. He then studied at the London School of Economics with Nicholas Kaldor and Friedrich Hayek. In 1939 he moved to Geneva where he studied at the Graduate Institute of International Studies. After moving to the United States he continued his studies at Harvard University and the University of Chicago. Hurwicz had no degree in economics. In 2007 he said, "Whatever economics I learned I learned by listening and learning."

In 1941 Hurwicz was a research assistant to Paul Samuelson at the Massachusetts Institute of Technology and to Oskar Lange at the University of Chicago. At Illinois Institute of Technology during the war, Hurwicz taught electronics to the U.S. Army Signal Corps. From 1942 to 1944, at the University of Chicago, he was a member of the faculty of the Institute of Meteorology and taught statistics in the Department of Economics. About 1942 his advisors were Jacob Marschak and Tjalling Koopmans at the Cowles Commission for Research in Economics at the University of Chicago, now the Cowles Foundation at Yale University.

== Teaching and research ==
Hurwicz in 1985

Hurwicz received a Guggenheim Fellowship in 1945–1946. In 1946 he became an associate professor of economics at Iowa State College. From January 1942 until June 1946, he was a research associate for the Cowles Commission. Joining full-time in October 1950 until January 1951, he was a visiting professor, assuming Koopmans' classes in the Department of Economics, and led the commission's research on theory of resource allocation. He was also a research professor of economics and mathematical statistics at the University of Illinois, a consultant to the RAND Corporation through the University of Chicago and a consultant to the U.S. Bureau of the Budget. Hurwicz continued to be a consultant to the Cowles Commission until about 1961.

Hurwicz was recruited by Walter Heller to the University of Minnesota in 1951, where he became a professor of economics and mathematics in the School of Business Administration. He spent most of the rest of his career there, but it was interspersed with studies and teaching elsewhere in the United States and Asia. In 1955 and again in 1958 Hurwicz was a visiting professor, and a fellow on the second visit, at Stanford University and there in 1959 published "Optimality and Informational Efficiency in Resource Allocation Processes" on mechanism design. He taught at Bangalore University in 1965 and, during the 1980s, at Tokyo University, People's University (now Renmin University of China) and the University of Indonesia. In the United States he was a visiting professor at Harvard (1969), at the University of California, Berkeley (1976–1977), at Northwestern University twice in 1988 and 1989, at the University of California, Santa Barbara (1998), the California Institute of Technology (1999) and the University of Michigan in (2002). He was a visiting distinguished professor at the University of Illinois in 2001.

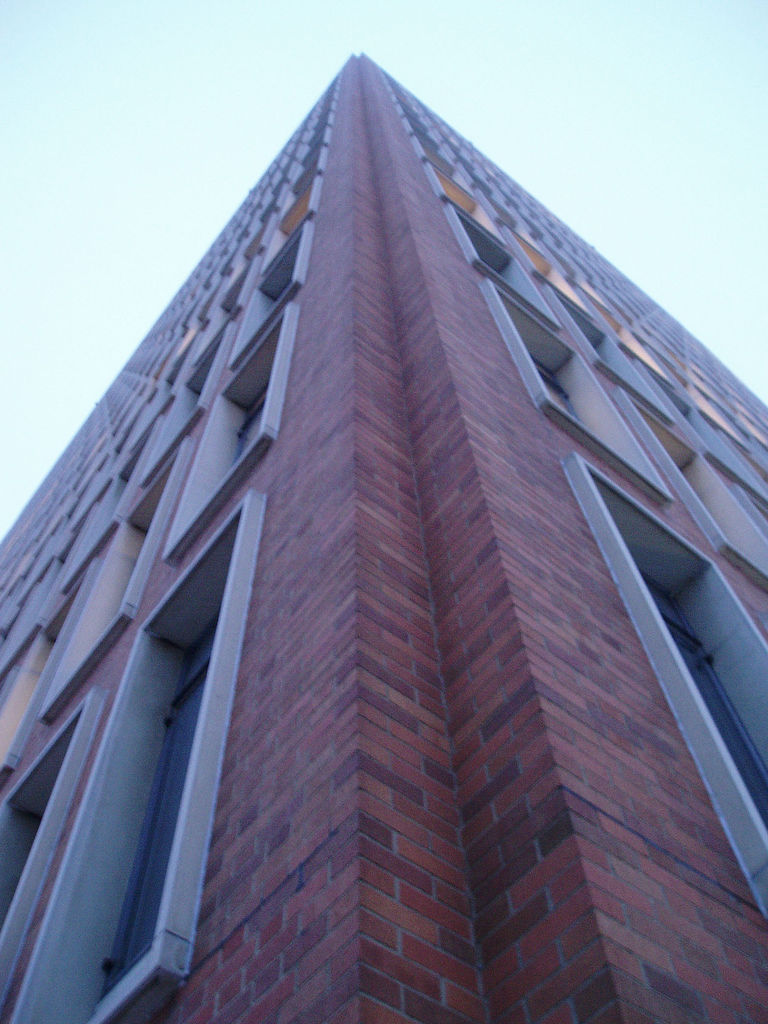
Twin of Heller Hall, named for Walter Heller, Department of Economics, University of Minnesota, West Bank

Back at Minnesota, Hurwicz became chairman of the Statistics Department in 1961, Regents Professor of Economics in 1969, and Curtis L. Carlson Regents Professor of Economics in 1989. He taught subjects ranging from theory to welfare economics, public economics, mechanisms and institutions and mathematical economics. Although he retired from full-time teaching in 1988, Hurwicz taught graduate school as professor emeritus most recently in the fall of 2006. In 2007 his ongoing research was described by the University of Minnesota as "comparison and analysis of systems and techniques of economic organization, welfare economics, game-theoretic implementation of social choice goals, and modeling economic institutions."

Hurwicz's interests included mathematical economics and modeling and the theory of the firm. His published works in these fields date back to 1944. He is internationally renowned for his pioneering research on economic theory, particularly in the areas of mechanism and institutional design and mathematical economics. In the 1950s, he worked with Kenneth Arrow on non-linear programming. Hurwicz was the graduate advisor to Daniel McFadden, who received the Nobel Prize in 2000.

Earlier economists often avoided analytic modeling of economic institutions. Hurwicz's work was instrumental in showing how economic models can provide a framework for the analysis of systems, such as capitalism and socialism, and how the incentives in such systems affect members of society. The theory of incentive compatibility that Hurwicz developed changed the way many economists thought about outcomes, explaining why centrally planned economies may fail and how incentives for individuals make a difference in decision making.

Hurwicz served on the editorial board of several journals. He co-edited and contributed to two collections for Cambridge University Press: Studies in Resource Allocation Processes (1978, with Kenneth Arrow) and Social Goals and Social Organization (1987, with David Schmeidler and Hugo Sonnenschein). His most recent articles were published in the journals "Economic Theory" (2003, with Thomas Marschak), "Review of Economic Design" (2001, with Stanley Reiter) and "Advances in Mathematical Economics" (2003, with Marcel K. Richter). Hurwicz presented the Fisher-Schultz (1963), Richard T. Ely (1972), David Kinley (1989) and Colin Clark (1997) lectures.

== Awards and honors ==
=== Memberships and honorary degrees ===
Hurwicz was elected a fellow of the Econometric Society in 1947 and in 1969 was the society's president. Hurwicz was elected a Fellow of the American Academy of Arts and Sciences in 1965. In 1974 he was inducted into the National Academy of Sciences and in 1977 was named a Distinguished Fellow of the American Economic Association. Hurwicz received the National Medal of Science in 1990 in Behavioral and Social Science, presented to him by President of the United States George H. W. Bush, "for his pioneering work on the theory of modern decentralized allocation mechanisms".

He served on the United Nations Economic Commission in 1948 and the United States National Research Council in 1954. In 1964 he was a member of the National Science Foundation Commission on Weather Modification. He was a member of the American Academy of Independent Scholars (1979) and a Distinguished Scholar of the California Institute of Technology (1984).

Hurwicz received six honorary doctorates, from Northwestern University (1980), the University of Chicago (1993), Universitat Autònoma de Barcelona (1989), Keio University (1993), Warsaw School of Economics (1994) and Universität Bielefeld (2004). He was an honorary visiting professor of the Huazhong University of Science and Technology School of Economics (1984).

=== Named for Hurwicz ===
First presented in 1950, the Hurwicz criterion is thought about to this day in the area of decision making called "under uncertainty." Abraham Wald published decision functions that year. Hurwicz combined Wald's ideas with work done in 1812 by Pierre-Simon Laplace. Hurwicz's criterion gives each decision a value which is "a weighted sum of its worst and best possible outcomes" represented as α and known as an index of pessimism or optimism. Variations have been proposed ever since and some corrections came very soon from Leonard Jimmie Savage in 1954. These four approaches– Laplace, Wald, Hurwicz and Savage– have been studied, corrected and applied for over fifty years by many different people including John Milnor, G. L. S. Shackle, Daniel Ellsberg, R. Duncan Luce and Howard Raiffa, in a field some date back to Jacob Bernoulli.

In 2010, the College of Liberal Arts at the University of Minnesota launched the Heller-Hurwicz Economics Institute, a global initiative created to inform public policy by supporting and promoting frontier economic research and by communicating findings to leading academics, policymakers, and business executives around the world. Funds raised by the Institute are used to attract and retain preeminent faculty and, in part, to support graduate student research.

The University of Michigan has an endowed chair named for Hurwicz, the Leonid Hurwicz Collegiate Professor of Complex Systems, Political Science, and Economics, currently held by Scott E. Page.

The Leonid Hurwicz Distinguished Lecture is given to the Minnesota Economic Association (as is the Heller lecture). John Ledyard (2007), Robert Lucas, Roger Myerson, Edward C. Prescott, James Quirk, Nancy Stokey and Neil Wallace are among those who have delivered the lecture since it was inaugurated in 1992.

=== Nobel Prize in Economics ===
In October 2007, Hurwicz shared the Nobel Memorial Prize in Economic Sciences with Eric Maskin of the Institute for Advanced Study and Roger Myerson of the University of Chicago "for having laid the foundations of mechanism design theory." During a telephone interview, a representative of the Nobel Foundation told Hurwicz and his wife that Hurwicz was the oldest person to win the Nobel Prize. Hurwicz said, "I hope that others who deserve it also got it." When asked which of all the applications of mechanism design he was most pleased to see he said welfare economics. The winners applied game theory, a field advanced by mathematician John Forbes Nash, to discover the best and most efficient means to reach a desired outcome, taking into account individuals' knowledge and self-interest, which may be hidden or private. Mechanism design has been used to model negotiations and taxation, voting and elections, to design auctions such as those for communications bandwidth, elections and labor talks and for pricing stock options.

Unable to attend the Nobel Prize ceremony in Stockholm because of his poor health, Hurwicz received the prize in Minneapolis. Accompanied by Evelyn, his spouse of six decades, and his family, he was the guest of honor at a convocation held on the campus of the University of Minnesota presided over by university president Robert Bruininks. Immediately following a live broadcast of the Nobel Prize awards ceremony, Jonas Hafström, Swedish ambassador to the United States, personally awarded the Economics Prize to Professor Hurwicz. His wife died in 2016 aged 93.

== Publications ==
- Hurwicz, Leonid (December 1945). "The theory of economic behavior". The American Economic Review. 35 (5). American Economic Association: 909–925. JSTOR 1812602. Exposition on game theory classic.
- Hurwicz, Leonid (April 1946). "Theory of the firm and of investment". Econometrica. 14 (2). The Econometric Society: 109–136. doi:10.2307/1905363. JSTOR 1905363.
- Hurwicz, Leonid (July 1947). "Some problems arising in estimating economic relations". Econometrica. 15 (3). The Econometric Society: 236–240. doi:10.2307/1905482. JSTOR 1905482.
- Hurwicz, Leonid; Arrow, Kenneth J. (1953). Hurwicz's optimality criterion for decision making under ignorance. Technical Report 6. Stanford University.

Also available as: Hurwicz, Leonid; Arrow, Kenneth J. (1977). Appendix: An optimality criterion for decision-making under ignorance. Cambridge Books Online. pp. 461–472. doi:10.1017/CBO9780511752940.015. ISBN 9780511752940.
and as: Hurwicz, Leonid; Arrow, Kenneth J. (1977), "Appendix: An optimality criterion for decision-making under ignorance", in Arrow, Kenneth J.; Hurwicz, Leonid (eds.), Studies in resource allocation processes, Cambridge New York: Cambridge University Press, pp. 461–472, ISBN 9780521215220

- Hurwicz, Leonid (1960), "Optimality and informational efficiency in resource allocation processes", in Arrow, Kenneth J.; Karlin, Samuel; Suppes, Patrick (eds.), Mathematical models in the social sciences, 1959: Proceedings of the first Stanford symposium, Stanford mathematical studies in the social sciences, IV, Stanford, California: Stanford University Press, pp. 27–47, ISBN 9780804700214
- Hurwicz, Leonid (May 1969). "On the concept and possibility of informational decentralization". The American Economic Review: Papers and Proceedings. 59 (2). American Economic Association: 513–524. JSTOR 1823704.
- Hurwicz, Leonid; Arrow, Kenneth J. (1972), "Decision making under ignorance", in Carter, C. F.; Ford, J. L. (eds.), Uncertainty and expectations in economics: essays in honour of G.L.S. Shackle, Oxford / New York: Basil Blackwell / Augustus M. Kelley, ISBN 9780631141709.
- Hurwicz, Leonid (May 1973). "The design of mechanisms for resource allocation". The American Economic Review: Papers and Proceedings. 63 (2). American Economic Association: 1–30. JSTOR 1817047.
- Hurwicz, Leonid; Radner, Roy; Reiter, Stanley (March 1975). "A stochastic decentralized resource allocation process: Part I". Econometrica. 43 (2). The Econometric Society: 187–221. doi:10.2307/1913581. JSTOR 1913581. Cowles Commission Discussion Paper: Economics No. 2112, (pdf).
- Hurwicz, Leonid (May 1995). "What is the Coase Theorem?". Japan and the World Economy. 7 (1). Elsevier: 49–74. doi:10.1016/0922-1425(94)00038-U.
- Hurwicz, Leonid; Reiter, Stanley (2008). Designing economic mechanisms. New York: Cambridge University Press. ISBN 9780521724104.

== See also ==
- List of economists
- List of Jewish Nobel laureates

Awards
Preceded by Edmund S. Phelps	Laureate of the Nobel Memorial Prize in Economics; 2007; Served alongside: Eric S. Maskin, Roger B. Myerson	Succeeded by Paul Krugman
