= Sigbert Prais =

Sigbert Jon Prais
- Born: 19 December 1928; Frankfurt-am-Main, Germany
- Died: 22 February 2014 (aged 85)
- Occupation(s): Economist, Senior Research Fellow
- Employer: National Institute of Economic and Social Research
- Awards: Fellow of the British Academy

Academic background
- Education: University of Birmingham, Fitzwilliam College, Cambridge
- Thesis: (1953)

Academic work
- Notable works: Analysis of Family Budgets, Evolution of Giant Firms in Britain

Sigbert Jon Prais, FBA (19 December 1928 – 22 February 2014) was an economist and had been the senior research fellow at the National Institute of Economic and Social Research (NIESR) since 1970.

== Life ==
On 19 December 1928, Sigbert Jon Prais was born in Frankfurt-am-Main, Germany; he was the oldest of four children to orthodox Jewish parents. His family arrived in Britain in 1934 as Jewish refugees fleeing Nazi oppression in Germany. Prais' father established a manufacturing company that made metal frames and ornaments for women's handbags, in Birmingham. Prais was sent to school in London and later continued his studies at the King Edward's School, Birmingham. From King Edward's School, he matriculated to the University of Birmingham for his undergraduate studies and then moved on to the PhD program at the Department of Applied Economics at Fitzwilliam College, Cambridge.

While at Cambridge, Prais collaborated with Hendrik Houtthaker on a study that focused on pre-war household expenditures. In 1955, Prais and Houtthaker's study was published as "Analysis of Family Budgets"; the study would prove to be a foundation for studies in subsequent research.

Prais had found great success in the field of economics after having his study published and was quickly asked to be a lecturer at the Fitzwilliam College, Cambridge Department of Applied Economics. In 1953, when Prais was 24 years old, he took up a fellowship at the Cowles Commission for Research in Economics in Chicago. There he made important connections for his career, most notably C. B. Winsten.

Together, Prais and Winsten conceived their "Prais–Winsten estimation". They formulated the econometric equation as a modification to the "Cochrane–Orcutt estimation" equation; it is believed to a more efficient formula for estimating the linear model.

In 1954, Prais maintained his lecturer position at the Department of Applied Economics at the Fitzwilliam College, Cambridge University while pursuing his career at the National Institute of Economic and Social Research (NIESR) in London.

From NIESR, Prais instantly went to work with Peter Hart on research into the growth of Great Britain companies. Prais and Hart's research led to the publication of two important studies on the matter: the first in 1956, titled "The Analysis of Business Concentration: A Statistical Approach", and second in 1976, "The Evolution of Giant Firms in Britain".

In the 1960s, Prais left academia and the field of economics for a full decade; he took up work in Birmingham in the industrial trade. He worked at his father's business as the finance director, and led the company to a successful flotation on the London Stock Exchange in 1964.

After leaving the family business, Prais decided to re-enter academia and the field of economics. He started back on with NIESR, and at first focused on researching an answer to why Great Britain's industrial performance had seemed to be lagging. He soon came to the conclusion that poor quality education and training were the root of the problem. His growing interests in the study and comparisons of different countries' educational systems and methods came to be internationally renowned. In 1987, Prais' innovative and expert analysis of international educational systems led to his appointment to the Kenneth Baker's mathematics working group. While on the group, Prais campaigned hard to raise the standards of education in Great Britain. In 1985, Prais was elected a fellow to the British Academy.

On 22 February 2014, Prais died from colon cancer.

== Education ==
Prais was educated at King Edward's School, Birmingham, the University of Birmingham (MCom) and Fitzwilliam College, Cambridge (PhD 1953, ScD 1974).

== Career ==
- Lecturer, Department of Applied Economics, University of Cambridge, 1950–57
- Post-doctoral Fellow, University of Chicago, 1953–54
- Research officer, NIESR, 1953–59
- United Nations Technical Assistance Organisation, 1959–60
- International Monetary Fund, 1960–61
- Finance Director, Elbief Co., 1961–70
- Visiting Professor of Economics, City University, 1975–84

== Positions and honours ==
- Member of Council, Royal Economic Society, 1979–83
- Member of Council, City University, 1990–94
- Fellow of the British Academy, 1985
- Hon. DLitt City University, 1989
- Hon. DSc University of Birmingham, 2006

== Publications ==
- Analysis of Family Budgets, 1955, 2nd edn 1971
- Evolution of Giant Firms in Britain, 1976, 2nd edn 1981
- Productivity and Industrial Structure, 1981
- Productivity, Education and Training, 1995
- From School to Productive Work in Britain and Switzerland, 1997
- Social Disparities and the Teaching of Literacy, 2001
