= Jennifer Thorne =

American ophthalmologist and epidemiologist

- Education: Johns Hopkins Bloomberg School of Public Health; College of William & Mary; University of Virginia School of Medicine
- Medical career
- Institutions: Johns Hopkins Bloomberg School of Public Health

Jennifer Elizabeth Thorne is an American ophthalmologist and epidemiologist. She is the Cross Family Professor of Ophthalmology and a professor of epidemiology at Johns Hopkins University.

== Education ==
Thorne graduated in 1991 with a bachelor of science, magna cum laude, at College of William & Mary. She completed a doctor of medicine at University of Virginia School of Medicine in 1996. She was an intern in medicine at University of Maryland, Baltimore from 1996 to 1997. From 1997 to 2000, she was a resident at Scheie Eye Institute. She was the chief resident from 1999 to 2000. Thorne completed a doctor of philosophy in epidemiology in 2006 from Johns Hopkins Bloomberg School of Public Health. Her dissertation was titled Visual acuity loss among patients with AIDS and cytomegalovirus retinitis in the era of highly active antiretroviral therapy. Her doctoral advisor was Curtis L. Meinert.

== Career ==
Beginning in 2013, Thorne holds a joint appointment as the Cross Family Professor of Ophthalmology at the Wilmer Eye Institute and a professor of epidemiology at Bloomberg School of Public Health. At Wilmer, Thorne is the chief of the division of ocular immunology.

== Personal life ==
Thorne is a member of the LGBT community and participates in the OUTList network of mentors at Johns Hopkins University.
