= Donald Cochrane =

Donald Cochrane may refer to:

- Donald Cochrane (politician) (1904–1985), Australian politician
- Donald Cochrane (economist) (1917–1983), Australian econometrician
- Donald Alexander Cochrane, Canadian composer
- Donald T. Cochrane (1906–1969), Canadian politician in the Legislative Assembly of New Brunswick
