= Stanley Reiter =

American economist (1925–2014)

- Born: April 26, 1925
- Died: August 9, 2014 (aged 89)

Academic background
- Education: Queens College, CUNY, (A.B.); University of Chicago (M.A., PhD)
- Doctoral advisor: Leonid Hurwicz; Tjalling Koopmans
- Influences: Kenneth Arrow

Academic work
- Institutions: Northwestern University
- Doctoral students: Hugo F. Sonnenschein, Scott E. Page
- Website: Information at IDEAS / RePEc

Stanley Reiter (April 26, 1925 – August 9, 2014) was an American author, economist, and emeritus professor at Northwestern University. Reiter contributed to the field of mechanism design.

In 2006, he and the 2007 Nobel prize-winning economist Leonid Hurwicz authored the book Designing Economic Mechanisms.

== Education ==
Reiter completed his A.B. with honors in economics from Queens College, CUNY in 1947. He then completed his M.A. (1950) and Ph.D. in economics (1955) from the University of Chicago.

== Career ==
From 1949 to 1954, he was associated with Stanford University as an instructor and a research associate. From 1954 to 1967, he was at the faculty of Purdue University. He joined the faculty at Northwestern University in 1967.

In 1960 Reiter coined the term Cliometrics.

Reiter contributed to the field of mechanism design. In 2006, he and the 2007 Nobel prize-winning economist Leonid Hurwicz authored the book Designing Economic Mechanisms.

Reiter was a fellow of the Econometric Society, the American Association for the Advancement of Science, and the American Academy of Arts and Sciences.

He died in 2014, and is survived by his wife Nina to whom he was married for 70 years, and children Carla and Frank.

== Selected bibliography ==
=== Books ===
- Reiter, Stanley; Hurwicz, Leonid (2008). Designing economic mechanisms. New York: Cambridge University Press. ISBN 9780521724104.

=== Journal articles ===
- Reiter, Stanley; Hurwicz, Leonid; Radner, Roy (March 1975). "A stochastic decentralized resource allocation process: Part I". Econometrica. 43 (2): 187–221. doi:10.2307/1913581. JSTOR 1913581. Cowles Commission Discussion Paper: Economics No. 2112, (pdf).
