= Clifford Hildreth =

American economist

Clifford G. Hildreth
- Born: December 8, 1917; McPherson, Kansas, US
- Died: August 15, 1995 (aged 77); Eugene, Oregon, US

Academic background
- Education: Iowa State University; University of Kansas
- Doctoral advisor: Gerhard Tintner; Leonid Hurwicz

Academic work
- Discipline: Econometrics
- Institutions: Michigan State University; University of Minnesota
- Doctoral students: Leigh Tesfatsion
- Notable ideas: Hildreth–Lu estimation

Clifford George Hildreth (December 8, 1917 – August 15, 1995) was an American econometrician. He was a head of the Department of Economics at Michigan State University.

A native of McPherson, Kansas, Hildreth earned his bachelor's from the University of Kansas before entering Iowa State University for graduate studies. After years at University of Chicago and North Carolina State University, he joined the faculty at Michigan State, before going to the University of Minnesota in 1964 where he held joint appointments in the Department of Economics, the School of Statistics and the Department of Agricultural and Applied Economics. He retired in 1988. His most notable contribution was a procedure for estimating a linear model in the presence of autocorrelated error terms, known as Hildreth–Lu estimation.

In 1960 he was elected as a Fellow of the American Statistical Association. He was President of the American Statistical Association in 1973, and the editor of the Journal of the American Statistical Association from 1960 to 1965. He was also a fellow of the Econometric Society and the Institute of Mathematical Statistics.

== Bibliography ==
- Clifford Hildreth; Francis George Jarrett (December 1, 1955). A Statistical Study of Livestock Production and Marketing. Wiley. ISBN 9780471396000. OCLC 7663737.
- Clifford Hildreth (1979). An Expected Utility Model of Grain Storage and Hedging by Farmers. Agricultural Experiment Station, University of Minnesota. OCLC 6878469.
