= Curtis L. Meinert =

American clinical trialist (1934–2023)

- Born: Curtis Lynea Meinert; June 30, 1934; Brown County, Minnesota, U.S.
- Died: June 13, 2023 (aged 88)
- Education: University of Minnesota
- Children: 3
- Scientific career
- Fields: Clinical trials, epidemiology, biostatistics
- Workplaces: University of Maryland, College Park; Johns Hopkins Bloomberg School of Public Health
- Doctoral advisor: Richard B. McHugh

Curtis Lynea Meinert (June 30, 1934 – June 13, 2023) was an American clinical trialist. He was a professor of epidemiology and biostatistics at Johns Hopkins Bloomberg School of Public Health.

== Life ==
Meinert was born on June 30, 1934, on a farm outside Sleepy Eye, Minnesota. His parents were Mabel Eleanor Christensen and Arthur August Edward Meinert. He was raised in rural Minnesota. He completed a B.A. in psychology from the University of Minnesota in 1956. He earned a doctor of philosophy in statistics at University of Minnesota in 1964. His dissertation was titled Quantitation of the isotope displacement of immunoassay of insulin. His advisor was Richard B. McHugh.

Meinert was the head of a clinical trial coordinating center at University of Maryland. Meinert researched randomized clinical trials for AIDS, cardiovascular diseases, and asthma. He was a professor of epidemiology and biostatistics and the inaugural director of the Center for Clinical Trials at Johns Hopkins Bloomberg School of Public Health.

In 1979, Meinert was elected a fellow of the American College of Epidemiology. In 1995, he was elected Fellow of the American Association for the Advancement of Science. He was a 2001 Fellow of the American Heart Association. In 2006, he was elected a fellow of the Society for Clinical Trials. In 2005, Johns Hopkins University established the professorship, Curtis L. Meinert Professor of Clinical Trials.

Meinert married Susan J. Matson on June 22, 1957. They had three daughters. He died on June 13, 2023, at the age of 88.
