= Leigh Tesfatsion =

American economist

Leigh S. Tesfatsion
- Citizenship: U.S.

Academic background
- Education: University of Minnesota; Carleton College
- Doctoral advisor: Clifford Hildreth; Leonid Hurwicz
- Website: Information at IDEAS / RePEc

Leigh Tesfatsion is a computational economist who taught at Iowa State University. She received her doctorate at the University of Minnesota, and taught at the University of Southern California before moving to Iowa State. She is known for promoting agent-based models as an alternative to rational expectations general equilibrium models for studying markets, finance, and macroeconomic phenomena. Her works are widely cited in the literature on the subject.

== Selected publications ==
- Leigh Tesfatsion, 1997. "How Economists Can Get Alife," in W. B. Arthur, S. Durlauf, and D. Lane, eds., The Economy as an Evolving Complex System, II, pp. 533–564. Addison-Wesley. Pre-publication PDF.
- _____, 2001. "Introduction to the Special Issue on Agent-based Computational Economics," Journal of Economic Dynamics & Control, 25(3–4), pp. 281-293.
- _____, 2002. "Agent-Based Computational Economics: Growing Economies From the Bottom Up," Artificial Life, 8(1), pp. 55–82. Abstract and pre-publication PDF.
- _____, 2003. "Agent-based Computational Economics: Modeling Economies as Complex Adaptive Systems," Information Sciences, 149(4), pp. 262-268.
- _____, 2006. "Agent-Based Computational Economics: A Constructive Approach to Economic Theory," ch. 16, Handbook of Computational Economics, v. 2, pp. 831–880. Abstract/outline. 2005 prepublication PDF.
- _____ and Kenneth L. Judd, eds., 2006. Handbook of Computational Economics, Volume 2, Agent-Based Computational Economics, Handbooks in Economics Series, Elsevier/North-Holland, Amsterdam. ISBN 0-444-51253-5. Description and chapter-preview links.

== See also ==
- Agent-based computational economics
- Macroeconomic model
