= James P. Quirk =

American economist (1926–2020)

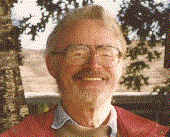
- James Patrick Quirk
- Born: November 27, 1926; St. Paul, Minnesota, US
- Died: June 4, 2020 (aged 93); Prescott, Kansas, US

Academic background
- Education: University of Minnesota–Minneapolis
- Doctoral advisor: Leonid Hurwicz

James Patrick Quirk (November 27, 1926 – June 4, 2020) was a Caltech professor of economics.

Quirk attended Marquette University in 1944-1945 towards a degree in civil engineering, he changed to economics 1946 while attending University of Minnesota going on to obtain a BBA in (economics) in 1948, a MA (economics) 1949 and a Ph.D. (economics)in 1959 from University of Minnesota. Between 1944 and 1946 he served in the U.S. Navy. He taught at St. Mary's University, San Antonio, Texas (1949–1951), then worked as an economist for the US government (Bureau of the Census, Washington, D.C., 1951–52, U. S. Dept. of Commerce 1952–53. After working as an economist for Pillsbury Co. and for Northwestern Bell, both in Minneapolis, he taught at Purdue University 1958–1965. In 1966 he became professor of economics at the University of Kansas. Between 1971 and 1987 he was professor of economics at Caltech, in addition to being a visiting professor at the University of Wyoming, Montana State University and University of Mississippi. He continued to teach part-time after retirement, and was a consultant, at various times to the California Hospital Association, the World Hockey Association, the Alan Cranston senatorial campaign, the U. S. Department of Justice, the Jet Propulsion Laboratory and others.

He also had a love for jazz and played the cornet with several different jazz bands, Cornet player with Salty Dogs Jazz Band, "On the River", CUCA Records, 1967 and leader and cornet player, Dungeness Traditional Jazz Band, Sequim, Washington, 2002–2013.

== Books ==
He was the author of several books:

- Quirk, James P., Study Guide, Principles of Economics I, General Extension Division, University of Minnesota, 1957.
- Quirk, James P., and Rubin Saposnik. Introduction to General Equilibrium Theory and Welfare Economics, McGraw Hill Economics Handbook Series, 1969; Japanese translation, 1972, Spanish translation, 1972; French translation, 1980.
- Quirk, James P., and Arvid Zarley, Papers in Quantitative Economics, University of Kansas Press, 1969; paper back edition, 1970.
- Quirk, James P., Intermediate Microeconomics, Science Research Associates/Macmillan; first edition, 1976; Spanish translation 1979; Chinese translation, 1980; second edition, 1982; third Edition, 1987; Japanese translation, 1989.
- Quirk, James P., Mathematical Notes to Intermediate Microeconomics; Science Research Associates; paper back, 1976.
- Quirk, James P., Coal Models and Their Uses in Government Planning; (Katsuaki Terasawa and David Whipple, editors), Praeger Press, 1980.
- Quirk, James P., Essays in Contemporary Fields in Economics, (George Horwich, editor), Purdue University Press, 1981.
- Quirk, James P., and Duncan McDougall, Economics, Science Research Associates, 1981.
- Quirk, James P., Minnesota Football: The Golden Years, 1932-1941, privately printed, 1984.
- Quirk, James P., and Rodney Fort, Paydirt: The Business of Pro Team Sports; Princeton University Press, 1993. According to WorldCat, the book is in 961 libraries, and was the Runner-up for the 1993 Choice Magazine Outstanding Reference/Academic Book Award.
- Quirk, James P., and Rodney Fort, Hardball, Princeton University Press, 1999.
- Quirk, James P., and Douglas Hale, George Lady, and John Maybee, Nonparametric Comparative Statics and Stability, Princeton University Press, 1999.
- Quirk, James P., The Ultimate Guide to College Football, University of Illinois Press, 2003.
- Quirk, James P., and Quentin Quirk, College Football Game Scores, 1869-2006, CD Rom; James and Quentin Quirk publishers.

== Academic papers ==
He is the author of several papers: According to Google Scholar, his most cited article, JP Quirk, R Saposnik "Admissibility and measurable utility functions" The Review of Economic Studies 29.2 (1962): 140–146., has received 529 citations.

- Quirk, James P., "Preliminary Mathematic Model For Business Strategy Game", Pillsbury Mills, Inc., 1957
- Letter to Joseph Bradley Pillsbury about the game developed, "A Description of The Game Model" Experimental Design and Mathematical Research, Pillsbury Mills, Inc., September 29, 1958.
- Letter from Dr. Britt school of Business Northwestern University to Pillsbury, Corp. about publishing, "Mathematical Models of Market Simulation: An example" in Journal Of Marketing, 1959.
- Quirk, James P., and Thomas F. Dernburg, " Per Capita Output and Technological Progress", Institute For Quantitative Research in Economics and Management, Issue Paper No. 1, 1960.
- Quirk, James P., "Summary:Default Risk and the Loan Market", Journal of Finance, vol. 15, no. 4, 1960.
- Quirk, James P., "The Capital Structure of Firms and the Risk of Failure", International Economic Review, Vol. 2, no. 2, May, 1961.
- Quirk, James P., and Rubin Saposnik, "Admissibility and Measurable Utility Functions", Review of Economic Studies, vol. 31, no. 1, 1962.
- Quirk, James P., Book review: Harry Markowitz, Portfolio Selection, Journal of Political Economy, vol. 70, no. 2, 1963.
- Quirk, James P., and James McRandle, "Summary: An Interpretation of the German Risk Fleet", Econometrica, vol. 3, no. 2, 1963.
- Quirk, James P., and Richard Ruppert, "Qualitative Economics and the Stability of Equilibrium", Review of Economic Studies, vol. 34, no. 3, 1965.
- Quirk, James P., Book review: David Huang, "Introduction to the Use of Mathematics in Economic Analysis", American Statistical Association Journal, 387-388, 1965.
- Quirk, James P., and James McRandle, "An Interpretation of the German Risk Fleet", in Papers in Economic History (Lance Davis and J. R.T. Hughes, editors), 1966.
- Quirk, James P., Lowell Bassett, and Hamid Habibagahi, "Qualitative Economics and Morishima Matrices", ''Econometrica, vol. 35, no. 2, April, 1965.
- Quirk, James P., and Rubin Saposnik, "Homogeneous Production Functions and Convexity of the Production Possibility Set", Metroeconomica, vol. 18, no. 3, 1966.
- Quirk, James P., and Lowell Bassett and John Maybee, "Qualitative Economics and the Scope of the Correspondence Principle", Econometrica, vol. 36, no. 3–4, July–October, 1968.
- Quirk, James P., "The Correspondence Principle: A Macroeconomic Application", International Economic Review, vol. 9, no. 3, October, 1968.
- Quirk, James P., and Richard Ruppert, "Maximization and the Qualitative Calculus", in Papers in Quantitative Economics (James Quirk and Arvid Zarley, editors), University of Kansas Press, 1968.
- Quirk, James P., and Arvid Zarley, "Policies to Attain External and Internal Balance: A Reappraisal", in Papers in Quantitative Economics (James Quirk and Arvid Zarley, editors), University of Kansas Press, 1968.
- Quirk, James P., Book review: Robert Kuenne, Microeconomic Theory of the Market Mechanism: A General Equilibrium Approach, in The Journal of Business, vol. 41, no. 3, 1968.
- Quirk, James P., and John Maybee, "Qualitative Problems in Matrix Theory", SIAM Review, vol. 11, no. 21, 1969.
- Quirk, James P., "Comparative Statics under Walras’ Law: The Case of Strong Dependence", Review of Economic Studies, vol. 38, no. 1, 1969.
- Quirk, James P., and Vernon Smith), "Dynamic Economic Models of Fishing", in H.R. McMillan Lectures in Commercial Fishing, University of British Columbia Press, 1970.
- Quirk, James P., "Complementarity and the Stability of the Competitive Equilibrium", American Economic Review, vol. 60, no. 2, June, 1970.
- Quirk, James P., "Competitive Equilibrium: A Qualitative Analysis" in Risk Programming and Economic Theory (John Chipman, editor), Springer-Verlag, 1970.
- Quirk, James P., "The Hospital As An Economic Institution", 1970.
- Quirk, James P., "Economics 203- Growth Theory", 1970.
- Quirk, James P., and Mohamed El Hodiri, "An Economic Model of a Professional Sports League", Journal of Political Economy, vol. 79, no. 6, November–December 1971.
- Quirk, James P., Book review: Trout Rader, Theory of General Economic Equilibrium, American Economic Review, 1973.
- Quirk, James P., "An Analysis of Team Movements in Professional Sports", Journal of Law and Contemporary Problems, vol. 38, no. 1, 1973-74.
- Quirk, James P., and Hamid Habibagahi, "Hicksian Stability and Walras’ Law", Review of Economic Studies, vol. 40, no. 2, 1973.
- Quirk, James P., "Employee Fringe Benefits- Faculty Caltech", California Institute of Technology, June 5, 1973.
- Quirk, James P., "Statement: The measure of a value asset in competitive market", Paper used to testify in court for Seattle Basketball team, 1973.
- Quirk, James P., and Mohamed El Hodiri, "The Economic Theory of a Professional Sports League", in Government and the Sports Business (Roger Noll, editor), Brookings, 1974.
- Quirk, James P., and David Montgomery, "The Role of Mathematics in Economic Theory", SIAM News, vol. 7, no. 6, 1974.
- Quirk, James P., Book review: Michio Morishima, Theory of Demand, in Journal of Economic Literature, 97-98, 1974.
- Quirk, James P., "A Class of Generalized Metzlerian Matrices", in Trade, Stability and Macroeconomics, Horwich and Paul Samuelson, editors, New York and London: Academic Press, 1974.
- Quirk, James P., and W. David Montgomery, "Factor Bias and Innovations: A Microeconomic Approach", Working Paper 38 has been published in Government Policies and Technological Innovation, National Technical Information Service. National Science Foundation, Washington, D.C. 20550. Vol. III, State-of-the-Art Surveys, PB244573. March 1974.
- Quirk, James P., and Mohamed El-Hodiri, "On Comparative Dynamics", Nov 1974.
- Quirk, James P., and W. David Montgomery, "The Market for Innovations", Social Science Working Paper Number 60, California Institute of Technology, October 1974.
- Quirk, James P., and Mohamed El Hordiri, "Stadium Capacities and Attendance in Professional Sports", in Management Science and Its Applications (Shaul Ladany, editor), North Holland, 1975.
- Quirk, James P., and Lance Davis), "Tax Writeoffs and the Value of Sports Teams", in Management Science and Its Applications (Shaul Ladany, editor), North Holland, 1975.
- Quirk, James P., " From earlier work by Sonnenschein, Debreu, and others", 1975.
- Quirk, James P., and Lance Davis, "The Ownership and Valuation Of Professional Sports Franchise", April 1975.
- Quirk, James P., and David Montgomery, "Rate of Return Regulation and Factor Bias in Innovations", 1976.
- Quirk, James P., and Stuart Burness, "Optimal Water Storage Policy With Applications To The Colorado River", Paper presented at AEA meeting New York, Dec 1977.
- Quirk, James P., and Stuart Burness, "Colorado River Project: Phase I: Water Rights And Allocations", Dec 1977.
- Quirk, James P., "Water Policy and Water Pricing in Reclamation Projects: The issue of Subsides", 1977.
- Quirk, James P., Manuscript review "Some Results in Comparative Statics", 1977.
- Quirk, James P., Comments on book, "Open Access and Extinction", 1977.
- Quirk, James P., and Katsuaki Teraswawa, "Review of the Nuclear Regulation Process", JPL report to the California Energy Commission, 1977.
- Quirk, James P., and David Montgomery, "Cost Escalation in Nuclear Power", in Perspectives in Energy, (L. Ruedisile and M. Firebaugh, editors), Oxford University Press, 1978.
- Quirk, James P., "The Simple Economics of Water", Engineering and Science, October 1978.
- Quirk, James P., and Roger G. Noll, and Joel A. Balbien, "Economic Policy of Boxing, Wrestling, and Karate: a Data Management System for California State Athletic Commission" 1978.
- Quirk, James P., Review Paper Terry Anderson- economic historian, Montana State University, July 26, 1978.
- Quirk, James P., Review of Report on "Venture Capital Investment", National Science Foundation study by Dr Willard Carleton, Dec 6, 1978.
- Quirk, James P., and H Stuart Burness, "Capital Gains and the Economic Theory of Corporate Finance", California Institute of Technology, Social Science Working Paper 232, September, 1978.
- Quirk, James P., and H. Stuart Burness, "Appropriative Water Rights and the Efficient Allocation of Resources", American Economic Review, vol. 69, no. 1, March, 1979.
- Quirk, James P., "Comments on Marine Economics", in Marine Sciences and Ocean Policy Seminar, UC Santa Barbara, 1979.
- Quirk, James P., "The Athlete’s Bill of Rights", in 1979 Proceedings, SMART, University of Massachusetts, 1979.
- Quirk, James P., "Some Economic Aspects Of Water Problems in the West", Paper presented at EQL Conference Water Problems in West, May 1979.
- Quirk, James P., and H. Stuart Burness, "Water Law, Water Transfers, and Economic Efficiency: The Colorado River", Journal of Law and Economics, vol. 23, no. 1, 1980.
- Quirk, James P., David Montgomery, and H. Stuart Burness, "Capital Contracting and the Regulated Firm", American Economic Review, vol. 70, no. 3, June 1980.
- Quirk, James P., David Montgomery, and H. Stuart Burness, "The Turnkey Era in Nuclear Power", Land Economics, vol. 56, no. 2, 1980.
- Quirk, James P., "The Reserve Clause: Recent Developments", in Current Topics in Professional Sports (M. Jones, editor), University of New Hampshire Press, 1980.
- Quirk, James P., and H. Stuart Burness, "Economic Aspects of Appropriative Water Rights", Journal of Environmental Economics and Management, vol. 7, no. 2, 1980.
- Quirk, James P., "Worked Example: STOCOMO with Random End Points", Jet Propulsion Lavatory, 1980.
- Quirk, James P., and Katsuaki Terasawa, "Divergent Expectations, R & D Expenditures and Technical Progress", Jet Propulsion Lavatory, 1980.
- Quirk, James P., "Bayes Rule Updating in STOCMO", Jet Propulsion Lavatory, 1980.
- Quirk, James P., "A Discrete Version of a Probabilistic Model of COCOMO: STOCOMO", Jet Propulsion Lavatory, 1980.
- Quirk, James P., "Bayesian STOCOMO: Updating Of Software Cost Estimates In A Probabilistic Framework", Jet Propulsion Lavatory, 1980.
- Quirk, James P., "Comments On A Demand Oriented Model Of Software Cost Estimation", Jet Propulsion Lavatory and Department of Energy, 1980.
- Quirk, James P., "Water Projects In central Valley—Preliminary", June 1980.
- Quirk, James P., "The Social Rate Of Discount—a literature review", RAND Corp., 1980.
- Quirk, James P., and H Stuart Burness, Ronald Cummings, "Ex Ante Optimality and Spot Market Economies", California Institute of Technology, Social Science Working Paper 365, December 1980.
- Quirk, James P., and H Stuart Burness, "The Theory of the Dam: An Application to the Colorado River", in Essays in Contemporary Fields in Economics (George Horwich and James Quirk, editors), Purdue University Press, 1981.
- Quirk, James P., "Qualitative Stability of Matrices and Economic Theory: A Survey Article", in Computer Assisted Analysis and Model Simplification (Harvey Greenberg and John Maybee, editors) Academic Press, 1981.
- Quirk, James P., Joel A. Balbien, and Roger Noll, " The Economics of Boxing Regulation in California", California Institute of Technology, Social Science Working Paper 366, January 1981.
- Quirk, James P., and Katsuaki Terasawa, "Divergent Expectations and R& D Expenditures" in Coal Models and Their Use in Government Planning (James Quirk, K. Terasawa and David Whipple, editors) Praeger Press, ch. 15, pgs. 241-259, 1982.
- Quirk, James P., and Katsuaki Terasawa, "Nuclear Regulation: An Historical Overview", Natural Resources Journal, vol. 21, no. 4, 1982.
- Quirk, James P., and Katsuaki Terasawa, "Market Externalities and the Role of Government in R and D Activities in the Energy Industry", JPL no. 15, Dec 1982.
- Quirk, James P., "A model of "True" Future Market", 1982.
- Quirk, James P., "A Beginner’s Introduction to The Principal-Agent Literature: A Summary Of Four Fundamental Papers", RAND, Corp., 1983.
- Quirk, James P., and Rodney Fort, "Asymmetric Arbitrage and Normal Backwardation", California Institute of Technology, Social Science Working Paper 467, February, 1983.
- Quirk, James P., and Ronald Braeutigam, "Demand Uncertainty and the Regulated Firm", International Economic Review, vol. 25, no. 1, February 1984.
- Quirk, James P., "Hedging as Speculation on the Basis", California Institute of Technology, Social Science Working Paper 553, December 1984.
- Quirk, James P., and Donald Lien, "Asymmetric Arbitrage and the Pattern Of Futures Prices Under Rational Expectations", California Institute of Technology, Social Science Working Paper 544, September, 1984.
- Quirk, James P., "Review of Uranium Markets and Prices", Martin Marietta Energy Systems, Inc., October 24, 1984.
- Appeared in Who’s Who in Economics, Eldgar Publishing, 1985 and 1986.
- Quirk, James P., "Consumer Surplus Under Uncertainty: An Application to Dam-Reservoir Projects", Water Resources Research, vol. 21, no. 9, 1985.
- Quirk, James P., and Katsuaki Terasawa, "The Winner’s Curse and Cost Estimation bias in Pioneer Projects" also known as "Sample Selection and Cost Underestimation Bias in Pioneer Projects", California Institute of Technology, Social Science Working Paper 512, and Land Economics, vol. 62, no. 2, pp. 192-200, 1986.
- Quirk, James P., "Comments on Intergenerational Problems in Resource Economics", in Natural Resource Economics (Daniel Bromley, editor), Bost: Kluwer-Nijhoff Publishers, 1986.
- Appeared in Who’s Who in America 44th edition 1986-1987, Volume 2, L-Z, Macmillan Directory Division.
- Quirk, James P., Memorandum from Rick Stroup copies of papers to review, Montana State University, 1987.
- Quirk, James P., "A Report on the Linkage between IFFS and GAMS Models", Department of Energy, July 24, 1987.
- Quirk, James P., "A Survey of the Literature on Cost Growth and Contracting Models in Defense Procurement", Rand Corporation, WD-3520-PA&E, 1987.
- Quirk, James P., Article by Edward H. Kohn, "The Stadium Dilemma-To Build or Not Build: Expert Calls Economics of 2 Plan Unjustified". Saint Louis Post Dispatch, Special Report, Sunday Jan.16, 1987.
- Quirk, James P., "A Report On The Economic Aspects of The International Nuclear Model", Department of Energy, 1988.
- Quirk, James P., and Rodney Fort, "Normal Backwardation and the Inventory Effect", Journal of Political Economy, vol. 96, no. 1, February, 1988.
- Quirk, James P., "Cost Underestimating Bias in Space Station Software Cost Estimation", Jet Propulsion Lavatory, 1988.
- Quirk, James P., "Lognormal Version of Bayesian STOCOMO: The model and a Worked Example", Jet Propulsion Lavatory, 1988.
- Quirk, James P., "Report on the Economic Viability of a Domed Stadium in St. Louis", report in the St. Louis Post Dispatch (special section), January 19, 1987.
- Quirk, James P., and Katsuaki Terasawa, "The Choice of a Government Discount Rate Applicable to Government Resource Use", Rand Report $-3464-PA&E, 1987, Rand Corporation.
- Quirk, James P., and Hamid Habibagahi, Mark Olsen, and George Fox, "Uncertainty and Leontief Systems: An Application to Space Station", Management Science, vol. 35, no. 5, 1989.
- Quirk, James P., Katsuaki Terasawa, and Keith Womar), "Turbulence, Cost Estimation, and Capital Intensity Bias in Defense Contracting", in T. R. Gulledge, editor, Lecture Notes in Economics and Mathematical Systems #332, Springer Verlag, 1989.
- Quirk, James P., and Robert Kuller, "The Phenomenon of "Throwing Good Money after Bad", 1989.
- Quirk, James P., "Report on M.A. Program in Economics at Bowling Green State University", 1989.
- Quirk, James P., Comments on "Theoretical and Empirical Evidence on Cost-Savings From Privatization Contracting " By Carlos Ulibarri, Orman Pannanen, and Mark Weimar", 1990.
- Quirk, James P., " Probabilistic Version of COCOMOX", Jet Propulsion Lavatory, 1990.
- Quirk, James P., "Whose Charade is it, Anyway?", 1990.
- Quirk, James P., "Memorandum: Review of the Independent Expert Review of Intermediate Future Forecasting System (IFFS)/Gas Analysis Modeling System (GAMS) Model Linkage", Department of Energy, sent to Yvonne Bishop, 1990.
- Quirk, James P., "Final Report: Independent Expert Review of World Integrated Nuclear Evaluation System (Wines)", Department of Energy, April, 1990.
- Quirk, James P., and John Hoag, Kyoo Kim, " Some Impacts of Price-Anderson On The Nuclear Energy Industry", 1990.
- Quirk, James P., and Mohamed El-Hodiri, "Sector Ranking Under Uncertainty In Leontief Models", 1990.
- Quirk, James P., Some Comments on "Resources Use: The Intertemporal Problem", 1990.
- Quirk, James P., and Katsuaki Terasawa, "Choosing a Government Discount Rate: An Alternative Approach", Journal of Environmental Economics and Management, vol. 20, no. 1, 1991.
- Quirk, James P., Hamid Habibagahi and Shahn Mulhotra, "Estimating Software Productivity and Cost for NASA Projects", Parametrics, vol. 11, no. 1, 1991.
- Quirk, James P., and Rubin Saposnik, "The Great Football Wars", in Advances in Sports Economics (Gerald Scully, editor), JAI Press, 1991.
- Quirk, James P., and Donald Lien, "Measuring the Benefits from Futures Markets: Some Conceptual Issues", 1993.
- Quirk, James P., "Markets, The Voucher System, And Public Education", 1993.
- Quirk, James P., "Cross Subsidization in Professional Team Sports Leagues" Presented at annual meeting of Minnesota Economic Association, 1994.
- Quirk, James P., and Rodney Fort, "Cross Subsidization, Incentives, and Outcomes in Professional Team Sports Leagues", Journal of Economic Literature, September, 1995.
- Quirk, James P., " Software Development Schedule Estimation: A review of the Literature", Jet Propulsion Lavatory, 1995.
- Quirk, James and Fort, Rodney, "Over-stated Exploitation: Monopsony versus Revenue Sharing in Sports Leagues." In John Fizel, Elizabeth Gustafson and Lawrence Hadley (eds.) Baseball Economics: Current Issues (Westport, CT: Praeger Publishers), pp. 159-178, 1996.
- Quirk, James P., and Stuart Burness, "Water Rights and Optimal Reservoir Management", California Institute of Technology, Social Science Working Paper 165, June, 1977.
- Quirk, James P., "Some Thoughts on the Economics of the proposed new Seahawks Stadium", 1997.
- Quirk, James P., " An Estimate of The Subsides to the Seattle Mariners From The Proposed New Baseball Stadium", 1997.
- Quirk, James P., "The Salary Cap: Affirmative Action for Small City Teams", in Stre-e-ike Four (Dan Marberger, editor), Greenwood Press, 1997.
- Quirk, James P., and Rodney Fort, "Reassessing Exploitation Rates in Baseball: The Effect of Gate Sharing", in New Advances in the Economics of Sports (Wallace Hendricks, editor), North Holland, 1997.
- Quirk, James P., "Stadiums, Arenas, and Major League Sports: The Twin Cities’ Experience", in Sports, Jobs and Taxes: The Economic Impact of Sports Teams and Sports Stadiums (Roger Noll and Andrew Zimbalist, editors), Brookings, 1997.
- Quirk, James P., "Qualitative Comparative Statics", Journal of Mathematical Economics, vol. 28, 1997.
- Quirk, James P., "The Minneapolis Marines: Minnesota’s Forgotten NFL Team", in Coffin Corner, vol. 20, no. 1997.
- Quirk, James P., " Source Of Cost Underestimation Bias", 1998.
- Quirk, James P., and Carlos Ulibarri; Orman Pannanen; and Mark Weimar, "Cost-Savings From DOE Private Contracting?", Paper presented in Session 233 of 73rd Annual Western Economic Association International Lake Tahoe, NV, July 2, 1998.
- Quirk, James P., and Rodney Fort, "The College Football Industry", in Sports Economics, Current Research (John Fizel, Elizabeth Gustafson, and Lawrence Hadley, editors) Greenwood Press, 1999.
- Quirk, James P., and Rodney Fort, "Why Do Pro Athletes Make So Much Money?" in Frontier Issues in Economic Thought, vol. 51, The Political Economy of Inequality" (William Moomaw and Neva Goodwin, editors) 2000.
- Quirk, James P., and H. Stuart Burness; Carlos Ulibarri; Orman Pannanen, "Auctioning Incentive Contracts: The Dual Problems of Characterizing Optimal cost Reduction Policies and estimating Potential Cost Savings", July 2000.
- Quirk, James P., "College Football Conferences and Competitive Balance", in Managerial and Decision Economics, vol. 25, 2004.
- Quirk, James P., and Rodney Fort, "Owner Objectives and Competitive Balance", The Journal of Sports Economics, January, 2004.
- Quirk, James P., "Minneapolis Mariners rough out History", Football notes, 2005.
- Quirk, James P., and James McRandle, "The Blood Test Revisited: A "New" Look at German Casualty Counts in World War I", The Journal of Military History, July, 2006.
- Quirk, James P., and Rodney Fort, "Rational Expectations and Pro Sports Leagues." Scottish Journal of Political Economy 54(No. 3 July):374-387, 2007.
- Quirk, James P., and George Lady, "The Scope of the LeChatelier Principle", Physica A: Statistical Mechanics and Its Applications, 2007.
- Quirk, James P., "The Capital Market Crisis", Report to students on view of the economic situation in January 2008.
- Quirk, James P., and Rodney Fort, "The Optimal Level of Competitive Balance in a Season Ticket League", 2009.
- Quirk, James P., George Lady, "The Global LeChatelier Principle and Multimarket Equilibria", Review of Economic Design, 2009.
- Quirk, James P., and Rodney Fort, "The Optimal Level of Competitive Balance in a Pro Sports League", Economic Inquiry, 2009.
- Quirk, James P., and H. Stuart Burness, Carlos A. Ulibarri, "Incentive-Based Procurement Contracts and Optimal Cost-Sharing Policy", 2010.
- Quirk, James P., and Rodney Fort, "Sport Team Behavior and Sports Policy: The Winning Percent Maximizing League", 2010.
- Quirk, James P., and Rodney Fort, "Optimal Competitive Balance in Single-Game Ticket Sports Leagues." Journal of Sports Economics11(December):587-601. Online First: March 12, 2010.
- Quirk, James P., and William Delehanty) "Equity and Efficiency: A Use of Efficiency as a Filter in Analyzing Schemes to Reduce the Concentration of Economic and Political Power (1915-1916)", May 2016.
