= Heller-Hurwicz Economics Institute =

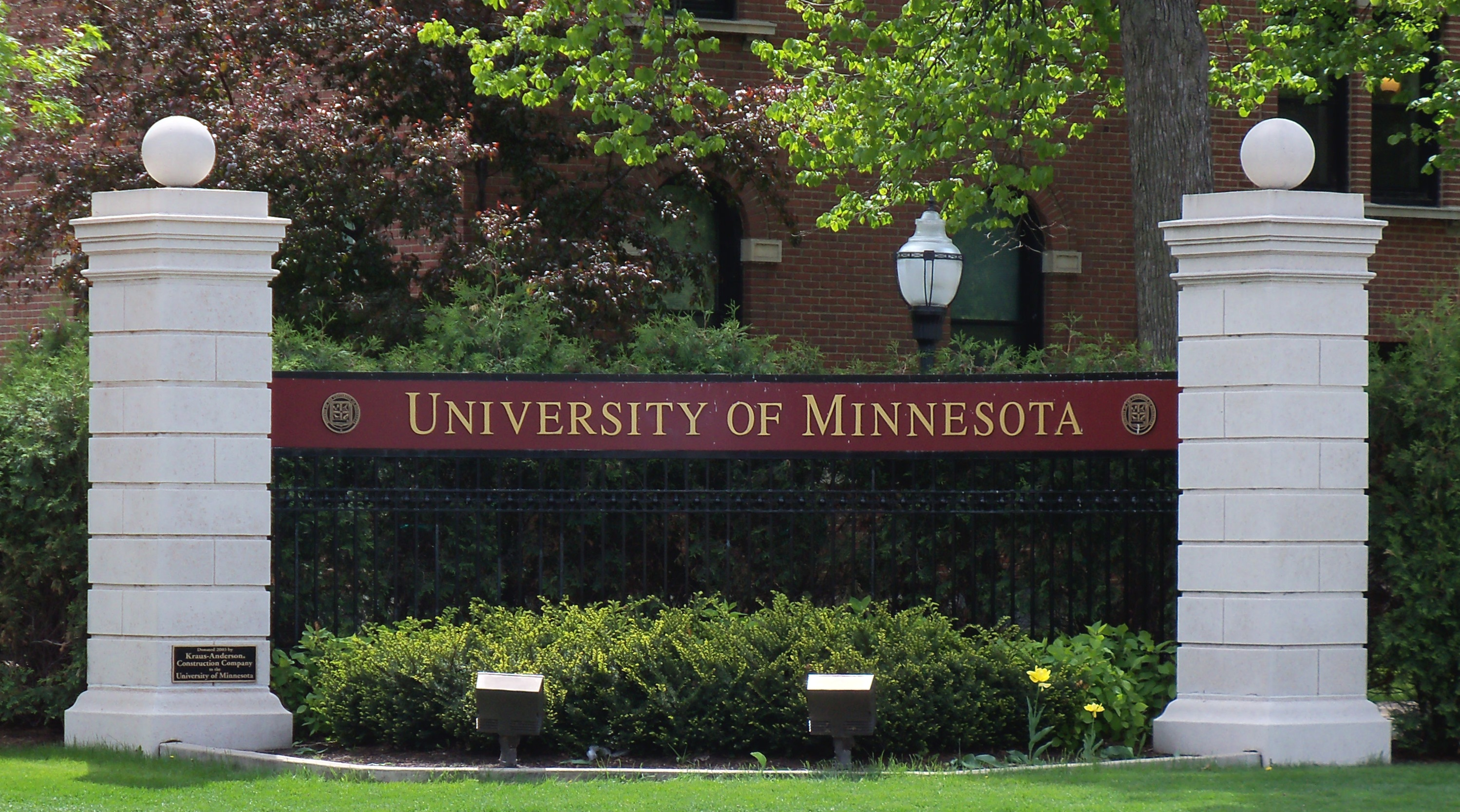
HHEI is part of the University of Minnesota College of Liberal Arts' economics department.

The Heller-Hurwicz Economics Institute was launched in 2010 in order to promote socioeconomic research.

== About ==
The Heller-Hurwicz Economics Institute (HHEI) was founded in 2010 within the University of Minnesota's College of Liberal Arts. It is named after economist Leonid Hurwicz, a Nobel laureate known for mechanism design theory, and Walter Heller, an economic adviser to US Presidents John F. Kennedy and Lyndon B. Johnson. According to the institute, its goal is to connect economic research with public policy. Its stated research areas include mechanism design, social safety nets, fiscal and monetary policy, corporate governance, financial regulation, and environmental policy.

=== Mission ===
The Heller-Hurwicz Economics Institute is a global initiative in the College of Liberal Arts at the University of Minnesota created to inform and influence public policy by supporting and promoting frontier economic research and by communicating our findings to leading academics, policymakers, and business executives around the world.

== History ==
The mission and intention of the institution is guided by legacies of Walter Heller and Leo Hurwicz. Both Heller and Hurwicz served as professors of economics at the University of Minnesota for the early 1950s through the 1980s, during which time they revolutionized the university’s economics department to be one of the world’s finest schools of economic thought. Heller, who served as one of the most influential economic policymakers under Presidents Kennedy and Johnson, was an innovator of taxation and social policy, two areas that guide the work of the Heller - Hurwicz Economics Institute. Hurwicz, on the other hand, fathered the economic theory of mechanism design, which helps organizations and businesses determine optimal outcomes given an individual’s motivations, honesty and social welfare. It is Leo Hurwicz’s contributions to economic science that not only influence thinking at the Heller - Hurwicz Economics Institute, but how political and economic dilemmas are solved today.

=== Director ===
V.V. Chari, 2010–2016

Ellen McGrattan, 2016-2022

Kjetil Storesletten, 2022-present

== Focus Areas ==
- Progress in understanding the optimal design of social safety nets—government insurance programs such as Medicare—which depend on taxation of some and transfer to others, while fostering work incentives.
- Furthering the design of fiscal and monetary policy, areas that Walter Heller pioneered directly by initiating President Johnson’s War on Poverty, and designing tax policies to shape the path of economic growth.
- Improving design of policies that align financial incentives and environmental protection, harnessing market forces to accomplish broader social goals by recognizing the externalities of economic activity.

== Affiliation ==
=== Nobel Laureates in Economic Sciences affiliated with University of Minnesota ===
- Leonid Hurwicz, faculty of Economics, 1951- 2008. Received the nobel prize in 2007 for having laid the foundations of mechanism design theory.
- Edward C. Prescott, Faculty, Economics, 1980-2003. Received the nobel prize in 2004 for his contributions to dynamic macroeconomics: the time consistency of economic policy and the driving forces behind business cycles.
- Christopher A. Sims, faculty of Economics, 1970-1990. Received the nobel prize in 2011 for empirical research on cause and effect in the macroeconomy.
- Thomas J. Sargent, faculty of Economics, 1971-1987. Advisory board Member, Heller-Hurwicz Economics Institute 2010–Present. Received the nobel prize in 2011 for empirical research on cause and effect in the macroeconomy.
- Lars Peter Hansen, Ph.D. Economics, 1978. Hansen is best known as the developer of the econometric technique generalized method of moments (GMM) and has written and co-authored papers applying GMM to analyze economic models in numerous fields including labor economics, international finance, finance and macroeconomics.
- Daniel McFadden, B.S. Physics, 1957; Instructor in Physics 1957-58; Ph.D., Economics, 1962. Received the nobel prize in 2000 for his development of theory and methods for analyzing discrete choice.
- Milton Friedman, University of MN Economics faculty, 1945 - 46. Received the nobel prize in 1976 for his achievements in the fields of consumption analysis, monetary history and theory and for his demonstration of the complexity of stabilization policy.
- George Stigler, University of MN Economics faculty 1938 - 46. Received the nobel prize in 1982 for his seminal studies of industrial structures, functioning of markets and causes and effects of public regulation.

== Research ==
- Economists Put Price on Climate Change, Conference Brief – October 2014
- Time is key to pricing climate risk, Bob Litterman – October 2013
- Why and how should banks be regulated?, VV Chari and Christopher Phelan – September 2013
- Public Pensions and Future Generations, Kurt Winkelmann - June 2021
