= Designing Economic Mechanisms =

Book by Stanley Reiter

- Author: Leonid Hurwicz, Stanley Reiter
- Language: English
- Subject: Mechanism design
- Publisher: Cambridge University Press
- Publication date: May 22, 2006
- Media type: Print, e-book
- Pages: 356
- ISBN: 978-0521836418
- OCLC: 823653501

Designing Economic Mechanisms is a 2006 book by economists Leonid Hurwicz and Stanley Reiter. Hurwicz received the 2007 Nobel Memorial Prize in Economic Sciences with Eric Maskin and Roger Myerson for their work on mechanism design. In this book, Hurwicz and Reiter presented systematic methods for designing decentralized economic mechanisms whose performance attains specified goals.

== Summary ==
The authors of this book, Leonid Hurwicz and Stanley Reiter, helped found the field of mechanism design. This book provides a guide for those who would design mechanisms.

A decentralized mechanism is a mathematical structure that models institutions for guiding and coordinating economic activity. Such institutions are usually created by administrators, lawmakers, and officers of private companies to achieve their desired goals. Their purpose is to achieve their desired goal in a way that economizes on the resources needed to operate the institutions, and that provides incentives that induce the required behaviors. In this book, systematic procedures for designing mechanisms that achieve specified performance goals, and economize on the resources required to operate the mechanism, i.e., informationally efficient mechanisms, are presented. Most of the book deals with the systematic design procedures which are algorithms for designing informationally efficient mechanisms. In the book, informationally efficient dominant strategy implementation is also studied.

== Bibliography ==
- Hurwicz, Leonid and Stanley Reiter (2006). Designing Economic Mechanisms. Cambridge University Press. ISBN 0-521-83641-7.
