= Myrna Wooders =

Canadian economist

- Born: May 22, 1941 (age 85)

Academic background
- Education: University of Minnesota
- Doctoral advisor: Leonid Hurwicz

Myrna Wooders is a Canadian economist who has made significant contributions to public economic theory, network theory and game theory. Specifically, her work has focused on coalition theory, public good theory and club theory. Myrna currently is a professor of economics at Vanderbilt University and the University of Warwick.

Wooders completed her PhD under Leo Hurwicz. She is editor of the Journal of Public Economic Theory, Fellow of the Econometric Society, Charter Member of the Game Theory Society, and the founding editor of Economics Bulletin. She currently serves as an elected member of the Game Theory Society Council and holds the Presidency of the Association of Public Economic Theory.

== Early life ==
Myrna Wooders grew up on a small farm in rural Alberta, Canada. Her father had a ninth grade education—the best one offered when he was a boy—and preferred helping out the neighbors by fixing their machinery to working on his farm. Her mother, who completed grade seven, loved planting and growing trees, flowers and gardens so while the trees have been called "the finest stand of trees in Eastern Alberta", the paying crops did not pay so well. Myrna spent hours each summer, as a small child, carrying water to the trees. She was the tallest of four sisters and that may be why she was chosen to be the farm worker of the bunch. She missed a couple of months of school each year to help on the farm. But much can be learned doing physical labor. Working in a granary during harvest time, leveling out the grain as it fell from the thrasher into the granary, she learned to keep shoveling (it was either that, or be buried alive). Until grade 9, with the discovery of the mailing services of the Library of the University of Alberta, there were few books to read; the family was not religious but some summers there was only the Bible. Myrna had children at a young age, prior to undergraduate studies, and became a photographer in another small Alberta town. With her two children in tow, she went on to complete her undergraduate studies at the University of Alberta and her PhD at the University of Minnesota.

== Academic career ==
Professor Wooders research focuses on public economic theory (particularly tax competition and the theory of local public goods), club theory (especially the relationship between markets and clubs), and coalition theory (particularly cooperative games with many players and their relationship to markets).

Myrna Wooders lives in Nashville, Tennessee, with her plants. She is the mother of the economist John Wooders, Professor of Economics of the University of Arizona and grandmother of Sarah Wooders, founder of Allparel, a clothes shopping site based on machine learning to determine accurate clothing labels.
