= Ellen McGrattan =

American economist

- Born: October 4, 1962 (age 64)

Academic background
- Education: Boston College (BS); Stanford University (PhD)
- Thesis: Computation and Application of Equilibrium Models with Distortionary Taxes (1989)

Academic work
- Discipline: Economist
- Institutions: University of Minnesota; Federal Reserve Bank of Minneapolis; National Bureau of Economic Research; Duke University
- Website: users.econ.umn.edu/~erm/

Ellen McGrattan is an American macroeconomist who is Professor of Economics at the University of Minnesota and past director of the Heller-Hurwicz Economics Institute, and consults for the Federal Reserve Bank of Minneapolis.

McGrattan's professional honors include being a research associate at the National Bureau of Economic Research, a Fellow of the Econometric Society, a Fellow of the Society for the Advancement of Economic Theory. She is a member of the Bureau of Economic Analysis Advisory Committee, and the Minnesota Population Center Advisory Board, and formerly served as president of the Midwest Economics Association.

== Education ==
McGrattan received a Bachelor of Science in economics and mathematics from Boston College, followed by a Ph.D. in economics from Stanford University in 1989. McGrattan has taught courses at Duke University, the European University Institute, the Stockholm School of Economics, the University of California, Los Angeles, the University of Pennsylvania, the International Monetary Fund, Arizona State University, and the University of Minho.

== Research ==
McGrattan is a macroeconomist who studies the effects of monetary policy and fiscal policy on observable economic outcomes, such as gross domestic product, investment, time allocation, stock market variables, and international capital flows. She has extended real business-cycle theory and reexamined puzzles in the study of business cycles, including (in joint work with Edward C. Prescott) the role of unmeasured investment in the 1990s United States boom. Other work on intangible assets has studied sweat equity. Other joint work with Prescott has studied the financing of pensions in countries with population aging.

== Selected papers ==
- McGrattan, Ellen R; Prescott, Edward C (2010). "Unmeasured Investment and the Puzzling US Boom in the 1990s" (PDF). American Economic Journal: Macroeconomics. 2 (4): 88–123. doi:10.1257/mac.2.4.88. ISSN 1945-7707. S2CID 152747062.
- McGrattan, Ellen R.; Prescott, Edward C. (2017). "On financing retirement with an aging population" (PDF). Quantitative Economics. 8 (1): 75–115. doi:10.3982/QE648. ISSN 1759-7323. S2CID 12155232.
- Bhandari, Anmol; McGrattan, Ellen R. (2019). Sweat Equity in U.S. Private Business (Technical report). doi:10.21034/sr.560.
