= Review of Economic Design =

The Review of Economic Design is a peer-reviewed academic journal that covers research on economic design. The journal covers topics that range from the application of normative economics to the strategic analysis of game theory, as well as novel ideas on the use of legal-economic instruments such as the assignments of rights.

== See also ==
- Review of Economic Dynamics
- Review of Economic Studies
