= Richard B. McHugh =

American mathematician, statistician and professor

Richard Burton McHugh (October 25, 1923 – June 1, 2016) was an American statistician. McHugh was a professor of biometry at University of Minnesota School of Public Health for over 30 years.

== Early life and education ==
McHugh was born in Villard, Minnesota and grew up in Minneapolis, MN.

He earned a bachelor of arts in statistics with a minor in mathematics, magna cum laude, in 1944 from University of Minnesota. He completed a master of arts in 1949. McHugh earned a doctor of philosophy at University of Minnesota in 1954. His dissertation was titled On the scaling of psychological data by latent structure analysis. His advisors were Leonid Hurwicz and Jacob Bearman.

== Career ==
Mchugh was Assistant Professor of Statistics and Psychology at Iowa State University in Ames, Iowa from 1950 until 1954 when he was appointed Associate Professor. In 1956 he began working at the University of Minnesota in Minneapolis as Associate Professor of Biostatistics in the School of Public Health; he became Professor of Biometry in 1961; and was appointed Professor and Director, Division of Biometry in 1968. He served on the faculty at University of Minnesota School of Public Health for over 30 years.

He was elected as a Fellow of the American Statistical Association in 1967.

== Personal life ==
A practicing Roman Catholic, Richard McHugh was married to Rosemary McHugh, nee Jarvis, with whom he had 2 daughters and 3 sons. He was preceded in death by his wife, daughter and 10 siblings.
