= Scott E. Page =

American social scientist

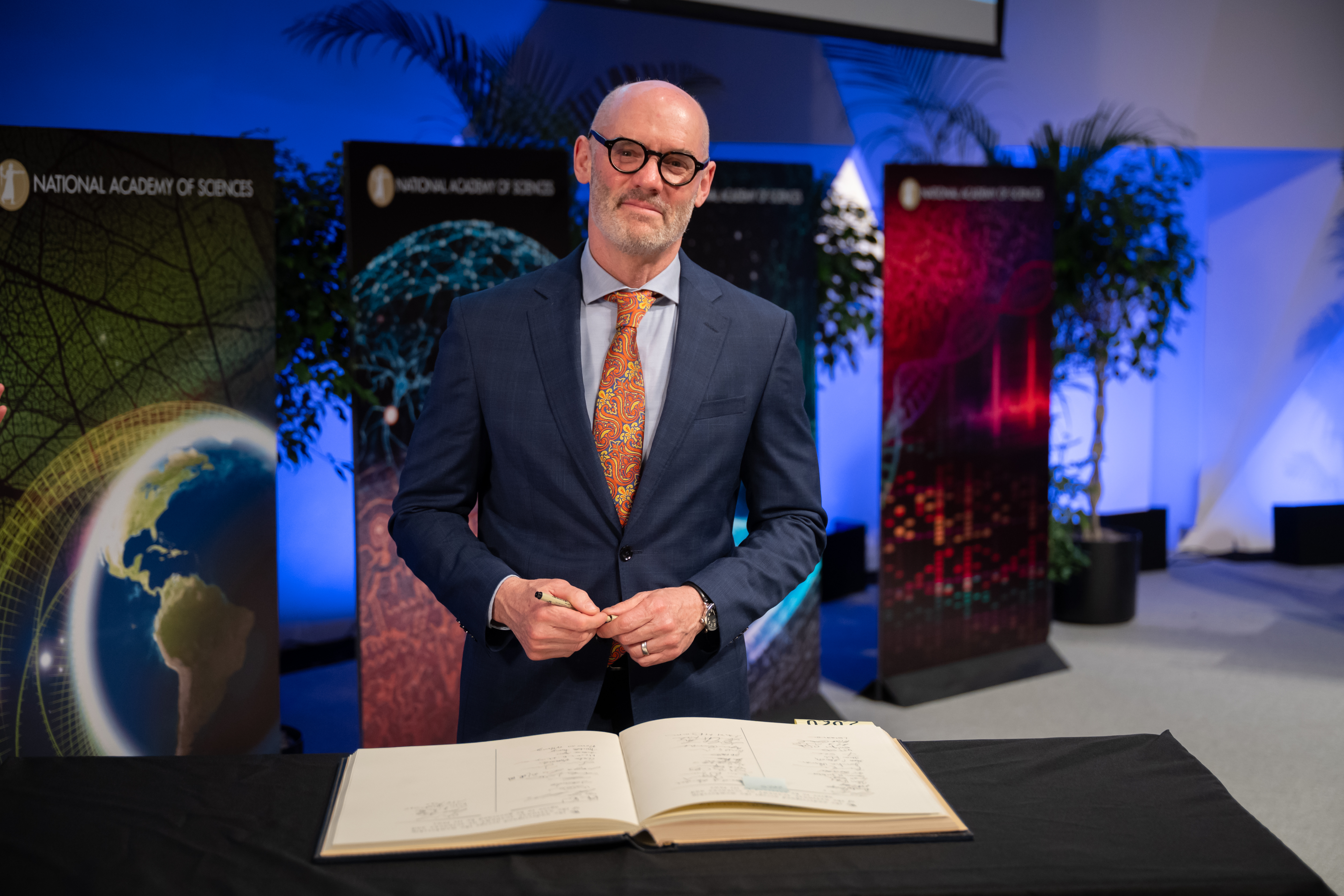
- Education: Northwestern University Kellogg (Ph.D., M.A.); UW–Madison (M.A.); Michigan (B.A.)
- Awards: Member of the U.S. National Academy of Sciences (2026); Fellow of the American Academy of Arts and Sciences (2011); Guggenheim Fellow (2013)
- Scientific career
- Fields: Management, Complexity, Economics, Political science
- Workplaces: Michigan (2000–); University of Iowa (1997–1999); UCLA (1994); Caltech (1993–1997)
- Doctoral advisor: Roger Myerson; Stanley Reiter

Scott E. Page is an American social scientist and John Seely Brown Distinguished University Professor of Complexity, Social Science, and Management at the University of Michigan, where he has been working since 2000. He has also been director of the Center for the Study of Complex Systems at Michigan (2009–2014) and an external faculty member at the Santa Fe Institute (2000–2005 and 2007–present).

Page is known for his research on and modeling of diversity and complexity in the social sciences. His specific research interests include path dependence, culture, collective wisdom, adaptation, and computational models of social life. His book, The Difference: How the Power of Diversity Creates Better Groups, Firms, Schools, and Societies, was designated a Princeton Classic in 2025. Also, Page helped launch the interdisciplinary journal Collective Intelligence in 2021, which he now serves as chief editor.

In addition to teaching at Michigan, Page also instructs the Teaching Company educational video series "Understanding Complexity" and the online "Model Thinking" course created by Coursera. He is an advisor to CrowdSmart AI, an artificial intelligence company focused on providing assistance to business managers.

== Biography ==
Page received his B.A. in mathematics at the University of Michigan, Ann Arbor, in 1985. He then received an M.A. in mathematics at the University of Wisconsin–Madison in 1988 and an M.A. in managerial economics from the Kellogg Graduate School of Management at Northwestern University in 1990. In 1993 he earned a Ph.D. in Managerial Economics and Decision Sciences also from the Kellogg School under the guidance of Stanley Reiter and Roger Myerson (his advisors), Mark Satterthwaite, and Matthew O. Jackson.

Before taking his current position at Michigan, he taught at the California Institute of Technology (1993–7), the University of California - Los Angeles (1994) and the University of Iowa (1997–9).

== Model Thinking MOOC and The Model Thinker ==
In early 2013, Page gave an online-course on the MOOC-platform Coursera called "Model Thinking". Due to massive participation this course has been repeated several times. In 2018, Page published The Model Thinker with Basic Books. The book summarizes and extends the material covered in the online course and promotes a "many-model thinking" approach to confronting complex problems.

== Awards ==
Page was elected to the National Academy of Sciences in 2025 and inducted into the American Academy of Arts and Sciences in 2011. He is the recipient of multiple National Science Foundation grants, including the IGERT award (2002–present), and the Biocomplexity Project SLUCE award (2001-6). He has also been the recipient of a MacArthur Foundation Initiative on Inequality and Poverty Research Grant and a Guggenheim Fellowship.

Page has received several teaching awards from Caltech, Northwestern, and Michigan, including, most recently, the University of Michigan Distinguished Diversity Scholarship and Engagement Award (2009).

== See also ==
- Agent-based model
- Collective wisdom
- Complex systems
- Path dependence
- Santa Fe Institute

== Bibliography ==
Books

- Page, Scott E. (2018). The Model Thinker: What You Need to Know to Make Data Work For You. New York, NY: Basic Books. p. 448. ISBN 9780465094639.
- Page, Scott E. (2017). The Diversity Bonus: How Great Teams Pay Off in the Knowledge Economy. Princeton, NJ: Princeton University Press. p. 328. ISBN 978-0691176888.
- Page, Scott E. (2010). Diversity and Complexity. Princeton, NJ: Princeton University Press. p. 296. ISBN 978-0-691-13767-4.
- Page, Scott E.; John H. Miller (2007). Complex Adaptive Systems: An Introduction to Computational Models of Social Life. Princeton, NJ: Princeton University Press. p. 284. ISBN 978-0-691-12702-6.
- Page, Scott E. (2007). The Difference: How the Power of Diversity Creates Better Groups, Firms, Schools, and Societies. Princeton, NJ: Princeton University Press. p. 456. ISBN 978-0-691-13854-1.
- Page, Scott E.; Kenneth W. Kollman; John H. Miller (2002). Computational Models in Political Economy. Cambridge, MA: MIT Press. p. 320. ISBN 0-262-11275-2.

Journal articles

- Page, Scott E. (2025). "Everyone, everywhere, all at once: LLMs and the new physics of collective intelligence". Collective Intelligence. 4 (3): 1–3. doi:10.1177/26339137251367733.
- Page, Scott E. (January 2006). "Path dependence". Quarterly Journal of Political Science. 1 (1). Now Publishing Inc.: 87–115. doi:10.1561/100.00000006. Pdf.
- Page, Scott E.; Kollman, Ken; Miller, John H. (December 1992). "Adaptive parties in spatial elections". American Political Science Review. 86 (4). Cambridge Journals: 929–937. doi:10.2307/1964345. JSTOR 1964345. S2CID 16178632.
