= Autocorrelation (words) =

In combinatorics, the autocorrelation of a word is the set of periods of this word

In combinatorics, a branch of mathematics, the autocorrelation of a word is the set of periods of this word. More precisely, it is a sequence of values which indicate how much the end of a word looks likes the beginning of a word. This value can be used to compute, for example, the average value of the first occurrence of this word in a random string.

== Definition ==
In this article, A is an alphabet, and $w=w_1\dots w_n$ a word on A of length n. The autocorrelation of $w$ can be defined as the correlation of $w$ with itself. However, we redefine this notion below.

=== Autocorrelation vector ===
The autocorrelation vector of $w$ is $c=(c_0,\dots,c_{n-1})$, with $c_i$ being 1 if the prefix of length $n-i$ equals the suffix of length $n-i$, and with $c_i$ being 0 otherwise. That is $c_i$ indicates whether $w_{i+1}\dots w_n=w_1\dots w_{n-i}$.

For example, the autocorrelation vector of $aaa$ is $(1,1,1)$ since, clearly, for $i$ being 0, 1 or 2, the prefix of length $n-i$ is equal to the suffix of length $n-i$. The autocorrelation vector of $abb$ is $(1,0,0)$ since no strict prefix is equal to a strict suffix. Finally, the autocorrelation vector of $aabbaa$ is 100011, as shown in the following table:

a	a	b	b	a	a						
a	a	b	b	a	a						1
	a	a	b	b	a	a					0
		a	a	b	b	a	a				0
			a	a	b	b	a	a			0
				a	a	b	b	a	a		1
					a	a	b	b	a	a	1

Note that $c_0$ is always equal to 1, since the prefix and the suffix of length $n$ are both equal to the word $w$. Similarly, $c_{n-1}$ is 1 if and only if the first and the last letters are the same.

=== Autocorrelation polynomial ===
The autocorrelation polynomial of $w$ is defined as $c(z)=c_0z^0+\dots+c_{n-1}z^{n-1}$. It is a polynomial of degree at most $n-1$.

For example, the autocorrelation polynomial of $aaa$ is $1+z+z^2$ and the autocorrelation polynomial of $abb$ is $1$. Finally, the autocorrelation polynomial of $aabbaa$ is $1+z^4+z^5$.

== Property ==
We now indicate some properties which can be computed using the autocorrelation polynomial.

=== First occurrence of a word in a random string ===
Suppose that you choose an infinite sequence $s$ of letters of $A$, randomly, each letter with probability $\frac{1}{|A|}$, where $|A|$ is the number of letters of $A$. Let us call $E$ the expectation of the first occurrence of ?$m$ in $s$? . Then $E$ equals $|A|^nc\left(\frac{1}{|A|}\right)$. That is, each subword $v$ of $w$ which is both a prefix and a suffix causes the average value of the first occurrence of $w$ to occur $|A|^{|v|}$ letters later. Here $|v|$ is the length of v.

For example, over the binary alphabet $A=\{a,b\}$, the first occurrence of $aa$ is at position $2^2(1+\frac 12)=6$ while the average first occurrence of $ab$ is at position $2^2(1)=4$. Intuitively, the fact that the first occurrence of $aa$ is later than the first occurrence of $ab$ can be explained in two ways:

- We can consider, for each position $p$, what are the requirement for $w$'s first occurrence to be at $p$.
  - The first occurrence of $ab$ can be at position 1 in only one way in both case. If $s$ starts with $w$. This has probability $\frac14$ for both considered values of $w$.
  - The first occurrence of $ab$ is at position 2 if the prefix of $s$ of length 3 is $aab$ or is $bab$. However, the first occurrence of $aa$ is at position 2 if and only if the prefix of $s$ of length 3 is $baa$. (Note that the first occurrence of $aa$ in $aaa$ is at position 1.).
  - In general, the number of prefixes of length $n+1$ such that the first occurrence of $aa$ is at position $n$ is smaller for $aa$ than for $ba$. This explain why, on average, the first $aa$ arrive later than the first $ab$.
- We can also consider the fact that the average number of occurrences of $w$ in a random string of length $l$ is $|A|^{l-n}$. This number is independent of the autocorrelation polynomial. An occurrence of $w$ may overlap another occurrence in different ways. More precisely, each 1 in its autocorrelation vector correspond to a way for occurrence to overlap. Since many occurrences of $w$ can be packed together, using overlapping, but the average number of occurrences does not change, it follows that the distance between two non-overlapping occurrences is greater when the autocorrelation vector contains many 1's.

=== Ordinary generating functions ===
Autocorrelation polynomials allows to give simple equations for the ordinary generating functions (OGF) of many natural questions.

- The OGF of the languages of words not containing $w$ is $\frac{c(z)}{z^n+(1-|A|z)c(z)}$.
- The OGF of the languages of words containing $w$ is $\frac{z^n}{(1-|A|z)(z^n+(1-|A|z)c(z))}$.
- The OGF of the languages of words containing a single occurrence of $w$, at the end of the word is $\frac{z^n}{z^{n}+(1-|A|z)c(z)}$.
