= Donald Cochrane (economist) =

Australian econometrician

- Born: 27 May 1917; Malvern East, Victoria
- Died: 31 March 1983 (aged 65); Richmond, Victoria

Academic background
- Education: Clare College, Cambridge; University of Melbourne
- Influences: Richard Stone

Academic work
- Discipline: Econometrics
- Institutions: University of Melbourne
- Notable ideas: Cochrane–Orcutt estimation

Donald Cochrane (27 May 1917 – 31 March 1983) was an Australian econometrician. He was a long-time faculty member at the University of Melbourne, and is known for developing the Cochrane–Orcutt estimation procedure.

A native of Melbourne, Cochrane graduated from the University of Melbourne in 1945, after serving in the Royal Australian Air Force during World War II. He continued his studies at Clare College, Cambridge, earning a doctorate under supervision of Richard Stone.
