= Error term =

In mathematics and statistics, an error term is an additive type of error. In writing, an error term is an instance of faulty language or grammar. Common examples include:

- errors and residuals in statistics, e.g. in linear regression
- the error term in numerical integration
