= Cross-spectrum =

Method in signal processing and statistics

In signal processing and statistics, the cross-spectrum is a tool used to analyze the relationship between two time series in the frequency domain. It describes how the correlation between the two series is distributed over different frequencies. For example, if two microphones are recording audio in a room, the cross-spectrum can reveal the specific frequencies of sounds (like a hum from an appliance) that are prominent in both recordings, helping to identify common sources.

Technically, the cross-spectrum is the Fourier transform of the cross-covariance function. This means it takes the relationship between the two signals over time and represents it as a function of frequency.

== Definition ==
Let $(X_t,Y_t)$ represent a pair of stochastic processes that are jointly wide sense stationary with autocovariance functions $\gamma_{xx}$ and $\gamma_{yy}$ and cross-covariance function $\gamma_{xy}$. Then the cross-spectrum $\Gamma_{xy}$ is defined as the Fourier transform of $\gamma_{xy}$

$$\Gamma_{xy}(f)= \mathcal{F}\{\gamma_{xy}\}(f) = \sum_{\tau=-\infty}^\infty \,\gamma_{xy}(\tau) \,e^{-2\,\pi\,i\,\tau\,f} ,$$

where

$$\gamma_{xy}(\tau) = \operatorname{E}[(x_t - \mu_x)(y_{t+\tau} - \mu_y)]$$.

The cross-spectrum has representations as a decomposition into (i) its real part (co-spectrum) and (ii) its imaginary part (quadrature spectrum)

$$\Gamma_{xy}(f)= \Lambda_{xy}(f) - i \Psi_{xy}(f) ,$$

and (ii) in polar coordinates

$$\Gamma_{xy}(f)= A_{xy}(f)  \,e^{i \phi_{xy}(f) } .$$

Here, the amplitude spectrum $A_{xy}$ is given by

$$A_{xy}(f)= (\Lambda_{xy}(f)^2 + \Psi_{xy}(f)^2)^\frac{1}{2} ,$$

and the phase spectrum $\Phi_{xy}$ is given by

$$\begin{cases}
\tan^{-1} (  \Psi_{xy}(f) / \Lambda_{xy}(f)  )     & \text{if } \Psi_{xy}(f) \ne 0 \text{ and } \Lambda_{xy}(f) \ne 0 \\
0     & \text{if } \Psi_{xy}(f) = 0 \text{ and } \Lambda_{xy}(f) > 0 \\
\pm \pi & \text{if } \Psi_{xy}(f) = 0 \text{ and } \Lambda_{xy}(f) < 0 \\
\pi/2 & \text{if } \Psi_{xy}(f) > 0 \text{ and } \Lambda_{xy}(f) = 0 \\
-\pi/2 & \text{if } \Psi_{xy}(f) < 0 \text{ and } \Lambda_{xy}(f) = 0 \\
\end{cases}$$

== Squared coherency spectrum ==
The squared coherency spectrum is given by

$$\kappa_{xy}(f)= \frac{A_{xy}^2}{ \Gamma_{xx}(f) \Gamma_{yy}(f)} ,$$

which expresses the amplitude spectrum in dimensionless units.

== See also ==
- Cross-correlation
- Power spectrum
- Scaled Correlation
