= Image registration =

Mapping of data into a single system

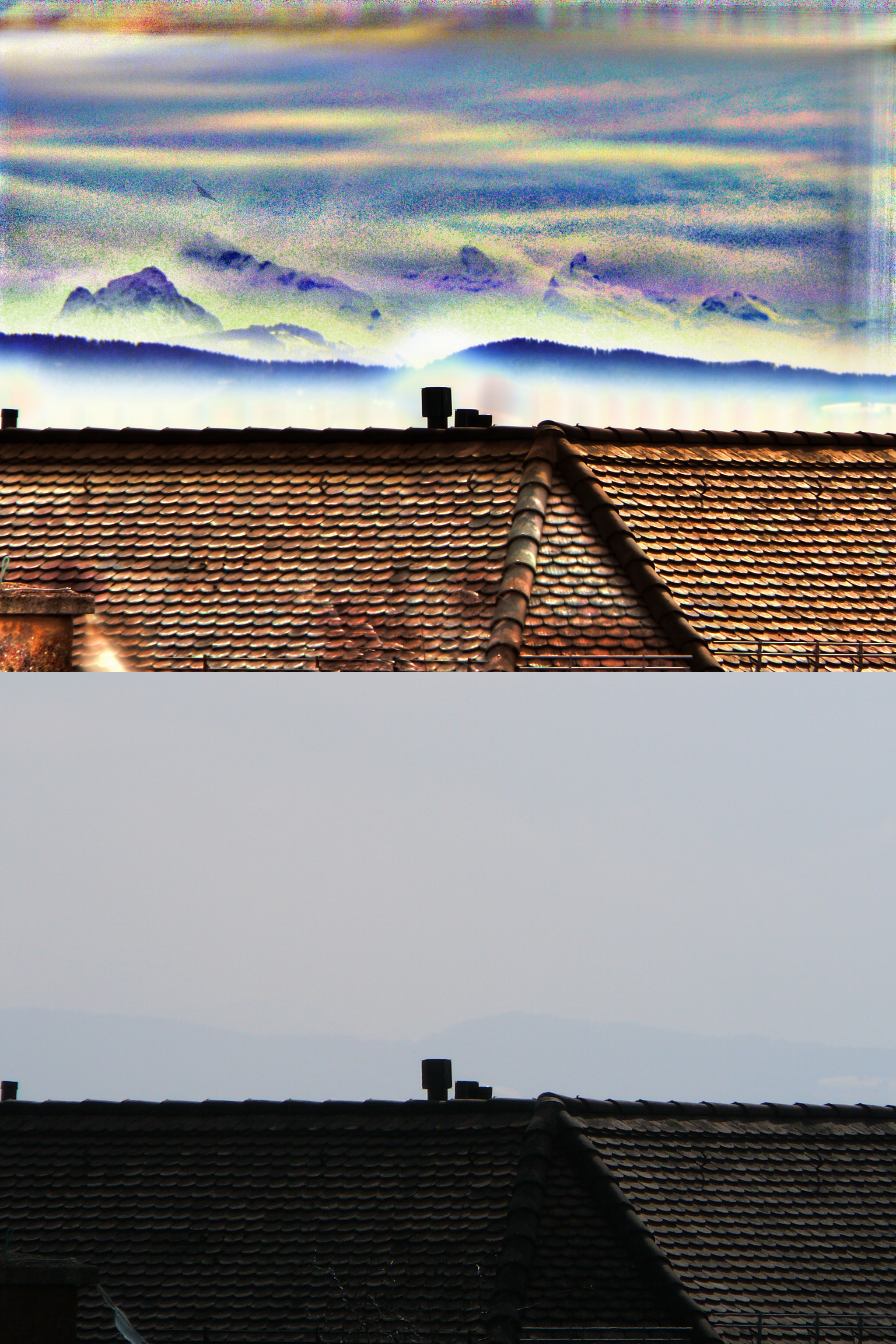
Registering and summing multiple exposures of the same scene improve signal to noise ratio, allowing one to see things previously impossible to see. In this picture, the distant Alps are made visible, although they are tens of kilometers into the haze.

Image registration is the process of transforming different sets of data into one coordinate system. Data may be multiple photographs, data from different sensors, times, depths, or viewpoints. It is used in computer vision, medical imaging, military automatic target recognition, and compiling and analyzing images and data from satellites. Registration is necessary in order to be able to compare or integrate the data obtained from these different measurements.

== Algorithm classification ==
=== Intensity-based vs feature-based ===
Image registration or image alignment algorithms can be classified into intensity-based and feature-based. One of the images is referred to as the target, fixed or sensed image and the others are referred to as the moving or source images. Image registration involves spatially transforming the source/moving image(s) to align with the target image. The reference frame in the target image is stationary, while the other datasets are transformed to match to the target. Intensity-based methods compare intensity patterns in images via correlation metrics, while feature-based methods find correspondence between image features such as points, lines, and contours. Intensity-based methods register entire images or sub-images. If sub-images are registered, centers of corresponding sub images are treated as corresponding feature points. Feature-based methods establish a correspondence between a number of especially distinct points in images. Knowing the correspondence between a number of points in images, a geometrical transformation is then determined to map the target image to the reference images, thereby establishing point-by-point correspondence between the reference and target images. Methods combining intensity-based and feature-based information have also been developed.

=== Transformation models ===
Image registration algorithms can also be classified according to the transformation models they use to relate the target image space to the reference image space. The first broad category of transformation models includes affine transformations, which include rotation, scaling, translation and shearing. Affine transformations are global in nature, thus, they cannot model local geometric differences between images.

The second category of transformations allow 'elastic' or 'nonrigid' transformations. These transformations are capable of locally warping the target image to align with the reference image. Nonrigid transformations include radial basis functions (thin-plate or surface splines, multiquadrics, and compactly-supported transformations), physical continuum models (viscous fluids), and large deformation models (diffeomorphisms).

Transformations are commonly described by a parametrization, where the model dictates the number of parameters. For instance, the translation of a full image can be described by a translation vector parameter. These models are called parametric models. Non-parametric models on the other hand, do not follow any parameterization, allowing each image element to be displaced arbitrarily.

There are a number of programs that implement both estimation and application of a warp-field. It is a part of the SPM and AIR programs.

=== Transformations of coordinates via the law of function composition rather than addition ===
Alternatively, many advanced methods for spatial normalization are building on structure preserving transformations homeomorphisms and diffeomorphisms since they carry smooth submanifolds smoothly during transformation. Diffeomorphisms are generated in the modern field of Computational Anatomy based on flows since diffeomorphisms are not additive although they form a group, but a group under the law of function composition. For this reason, flows which generalize the ideas of additive groups allow for generating large deformations that preserve topology, providing 1-1 and onto transformations. Computational methods for generating such transformation are often called LDDMM which provide flows of diffeomorphisms as the main computational tool for connecting coordinate systems corresponding to the geodesic flows of Computational Anatomy.

There are a number of programs which generate diffeomorphic transformations of coordinates via diffeomorphic mapping including MRI Studio and MRI Cloud.org

=== Spatial vs frequency domain methods ===
Spatial methods operate in the image domain, matching intensity patterns or features in images. Some of the feature matching algorithms are outgrowths of traditional techniques for performing manual image registration, in which an operator chooses corresponding control points (CP) in images. When the number of control points exceeds the minimum required to define the appropriate transformation model, iterative algorithms like RANSAC can be used to robustly estimate the parameters of a particular transformation type (e.g. affine) for registration of the images.

Frequency-domain methods find the transformation parameters for registration of the images while working in the transform domain. Such methods work for simple transformations, such as translation, rotation, and scaling. Applying the phase correlation method to a pair of images produces a third image which contains a single peak. The location of this peak corresponds to the relative translation between the images. Unlike many spatial-domain algorithms, the phase correlation method is resilient to noise, occlusions, and other defects typical of medical or satellite images. Additionally, the phase correlation uses the fast Fourier transform to compute the cross-correlation between the two images, generally resulting in large performance gains. The method can be extended to determine rotation and scaling differences between two images by first converting the images to log-polar coordinates. Due to properties of the Fourier transform, the rotation and scaling parameters can be determined in a manner invariant to translation.

=== Single- vs multi-modality methods ===
Another classification can be made between single-modality and multi-modality methods. Single-modality methods tend to register images in the same modality acquired by the same scanner/sensor type, while multi-modality registration methods tended to register images acquired by different scanner/sensor types.

Multi-modality registration methods are often used in medical imaging as images of a subject are frequently obtained from different scanners. Examples include registration of brain CT/MRI images or whole body PET/CT images for tumor localization, registration of contrast-enhanced CT images against non-contrast-enhanced CT images for segmentation of specific parts of the anatomy, and registration of ultrasound and CT images for prostate localization in radiotherapy.

=== Automatic vs interactive methods ===
Registration methods may be classified based on the level of automation they provide. Manual, interactive, semi-automatic, and automatic methods have been developed. Manual methods provide tools to align the images manually. Interactive methods reduce user bias by performing certain key operations automatically while still relying on the user to guide the registration. Semi-automatic methods perform more of the registration steps automatically but depend on the user to verify the correctness of a registration. Automatic methods do not allow any user interaction and perform all registration steps automatically.

=== Similarity measures for image registration ===
Image similarities are broadly used in medical imaging. An image similarity measure quantifies the degree of similarity between intensity patterns in two images. The choice of an image similarity measure depends on the modality of the images to be registered. Common examples of image similarity measures include cross-correlation, mutual information, sum of squared intensity differences, and ratio image uniformity. Mutual information and normalized mutual information are the most popular image similarity measures for registration of multimodality images. Cross-correlation, sum of squared intensity differences and ratio image uniformity are commonly used for registration of images in the same modality.

Many new features have been derived for cost functions based on matching methods via large deformations have emerged in the field Computational Anatomy including Measure matching which are pointsets or landmarks without correspondence, Curve matching and Surface matching via mathematical currents and varifolds.

== Uncertainty ==
There is a level of uncertainty associated with registering images that have any spatio-temporal differences. A confident registration with a measure of uncertainty is critical for many change detection applications such as medical diagnostics.

In remote sensing applications where a digital image pixel may represent several kilometers of spatial distance (such as NASA's LANDSAT imagery), an uncertain image registration can mean that a solution could be several kilometers from ground truth. Several notable papers have attempted to quantify uncertainty in image registration in order to compare results. However, many approaches to quantifying uncertainty or estimating deformations are computationally intensive or are only applicable to limited sets of spatial transformations.

== Applications ==
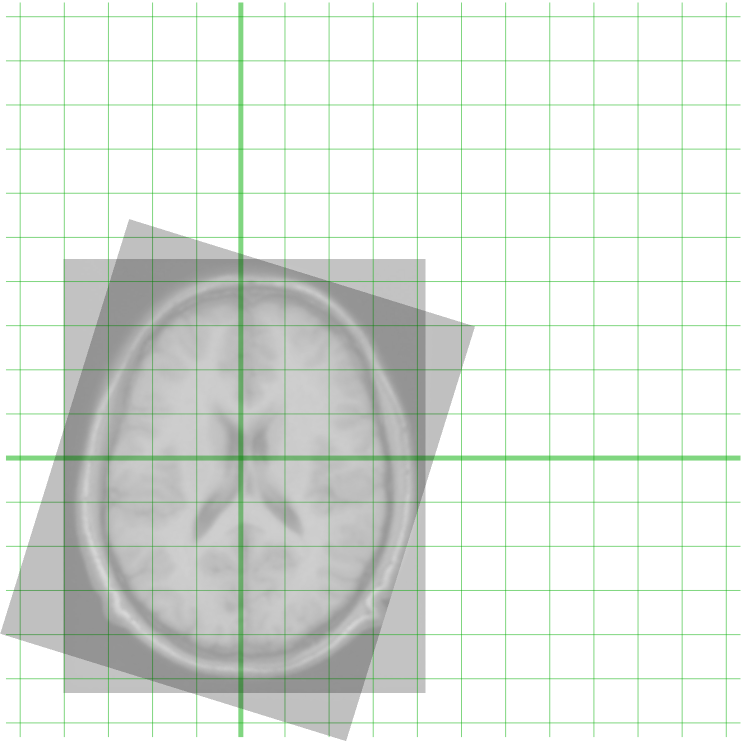
Registration of two MRI images of the brain

Image registration has applications in remote sensing (cartography updating), and computer vision. Due to the vast range of applications to which image registration can be applied, it is impossible to develop a general method that is optimized for all uses.

Medical image registration (eg. for data of the same patient taken at different points in time such as change detection or tumor monitoring (longitudinal studies) often additionally involves elastic (also known as nonrigid) registration to cope with deformation of the subject (due to breathing, anatomical changes, and so forth) and large anatomical differences between different subjects. Nonrigid registration of medical images can also be used to register a patient's data to an anatomical atlas, such as the Talairach atlas for neuroimaging. Another application of image registration for medical imaging is the registration of a number of subjects to a single reference space for cohort-wise analyses. In other cases, nonrigid registration is explicitly not utilized since rigid registration methods preserve the underlying geometry, e.g., in inner ear imaging. This is preferred for structures with low variability in anatomy in the cohort that is being studied.

In Radiation therapy rigid image registration (RIR) is a fundamental element in most imaging software systems. It involves aligning images by applying translational and rotational adjustments, up to a six degrees of freedom—three for translation along the x, y, and z axes, and three for rotation about these axes. RIR aligns images appropriately using these six parameters, allowing for precise treatment planning and delivery.

In astrophotography, image alignment and stacking are often used to increase the signal to noise ratio for faint objects. Without stacking it may be used to produce a timelapse of events such as a planet's rotation of a transit across the Sun. Using control points (automatically or manually entered), the computer performs transformations on one image to make major features align with a second or multiple images. This technique may also be used for images of different sizes, to allow images taken through different telescopes or lenses to be combined.

In cryo-TEM, instability causes specimen drift and many fast acquisitions with accurate image registration is required to preserve high resolution and obtain high signal to noise images. For low SNR data, the best image registration is achieved by cross-correlating all permutations of images in an image stack.

Image registration is an essential part of panoramic image creation. There are many different techniques that can be implemented in real time and run on embedded devices like cameras and camera-phones.

== See also ==
- Computational Anatomy
- Correspondence problem
- Digital image correlation and tracking
- Elastix, an image registration toolbox
- Georeferencing
- Image correlation
- Image rectification
- Inverse consistency
- Point set registration
- Rubbersheeting
- Spatial normalization
- Spatial verification
