= Video standards converter =

Device to convert between analog video standards

A video standards converter is a video device that converts NTSC to PAL and/or PAL to NTSC. The PAL TV signals may be transcoded to or from SECAM.

Video standards converters are primarily used so television shows can be viewed in nations with different video standards.

With the use of high-definition television, new digital video standards converters came on the market. Some were down converters only, HDTV to PAL or NTSC. Others could both up and down convert: HDTV to standard definition: PAL or NTSC and vice versa.

== History ==
Converters are needed because NTSC uses 30 frames (pictures) per second and PAL uses 25 frames per second. First video standards converters were analog. That is a special professional video camera that used a video camera tube would be pointed at a cathode ray tube video monitor. Both the Camera and the monitor could be switched to either NTSC or PAL, to convert both ways. Robert Bosch GmbH's Fernseh Division made a large three rack analog video standards converter, Model NC 56 P 40. These were the high-end converters of the 1960s and 1970s. Image Transform in Universal City, CA used the Fernseh converter and in the 1980s made their own a custom digital converter. This was also a larger 3 rack device. As digital memory size became larger in smaller packages converters became the size of a microwave oven. Today one can buy a very small converter for home use.

== See also ==
- Reverse Standards Conversion
- Scan conversion
- Television standards conversion
