= Digital image correlation for electronics =

Digital image analysis tool

Digital image correlation analyses have applications in material property characterization, displacement measurement, and strain mapping. As such, DIC is becoming an increasingly popular tool when evaluating the thermo-mechanical behavior of electronic components and systems.

== CTE measurements and glass transition temperature identification ==
The most common application of DIC in the electronics industry is the measurement of coefficient of thermal expansion (CTE). Because it is a non-contact, full-field surface technique, DIC is ideal for measuring the effective CTE of printed circuit boards (PCBs) and individual surfaces of electronic components. It is especially useful for characterizing the properties of complex integrated circuits, as the combined thermal expansion effects of the substrate, molding compound, and die make effective CTE difficult to estimate at the substrate surface with other experimental methods. DIC techniques can be used to calculate average in-plane strain as a function of temperature over an area of interest during a thermal profile. Linear curve-fitting and slope calculation can then be used to estimate an effective CTE for the observed area. Because the driving factor in solder fatigue is most often the CTE mismatch between a component and the PCB it is soldered to, accurate CTE measurements are vital for calculating printed circuit board assembly (PCBA) reliability metrics.

DIC is also useful for characterizing the thermal properties of polymers. Polymers are often used in electronic assemblies as potting compounds, conformal coatings, adhesives, molding compounds, dielectrics, and underfills. Because the stiffness of such materials can vary widely, accurately determining their thermal characteristics with contact techniques that transfer load to the specimen, such as dynamic mechanical analysis (DMA) and thermomechanical analysis (TMA), is difficult to do with consistency. Accurate CTE measurements are important for these materials because, depending on the specific use case, expansion and contraction of these materials can drastically affect solder joint reliability. For example, if a stiff conformal coating or other polymeric encapsulation is allowed to flow under a QFN, its expansion and contraction during thermal cycling can add tensile stress to the solder joints and expedite fatigue failure.

DIC techniques will also allow the detection of glass transition temperature (T_{g}). At a glass transition temperature, the strain vs. temperature plot will exhibit a change in slope.

Determining the T_{g} is very important for polymeric materials that could have glass transition temperatures within the operating temperature range of the electronics assemblies and components on which they are used. For example, some potting materials can see the Elastic Modulus of the material change by a factor of 100 or more over the glass transition region. Such changes can have drastic effects on an electronic assembly's reliability if they are not planned for in the design process.

== Out-of-plane component warpage ==
When 3D DIC techniques are employed, out-of-plane motion can be tracked in addition to in-plane motion. Out-of-plane warpage is especially of interest at the component level of electronics packaging for solder joint reliability quantification. Excessive warpage during reflow can contribute to defective solder joints by lifting the edges of the component away from the board and creating head-in-pillow defects in ball grid arrays (BGA). Warpage can also shorten the fatigue life of adequate joints by adding tensile stress to edge joints during thermal cycling.

== Thermo-mechanical strain mapping ==
When a PCBA is over-constrained, thermo-mechanical stress brought about during thermal expansion can cause board strains that could negatively affect individual component and overall assembly reliability. The full-field monitoring capabilities of an image correlation technique allow for the measurement of strain magnitude and location on the surface of a specimen during a displacement-causing event, such as PCBA during a thermal profile. These "strain maps" allow for the comparison of strain levels over full areas of interest. Many traditional discrete methods, like extensometers and strain gauges, only allow for localized measurements of strain, inhibiting their ability to efficiently measure strain across larger areas of interest. DIC techniques have also been used to generate strain maps from purely mechanical events, such as drop impact tests, on electronic assemblies.

== See also ==
- Glass Transition
- Thermal Analysis
