= AIR (program) =

The AIR (Automated Image Registration) is a program suite for volume-based image registration constructed by Roger P. Woods from UCLA School of Medicine. It reads and writes Analyze volume files and can work with 4x4 transformation matrices stored in its own file format with the filename extension .air.

It is especially designed for neuroimaging applications and has primarily been used in research-oriented functional neuroimaging with brain scans from positron emission tomography and magnetic resonance scanners.

The suite provides a number of programs for image registration with different transformation models, such as rigid-body, affine and nonlinear warping. For example, for affine transformation the registration from one brain scan to another may be found with the alignlinear program and written to the special air-file that stores the transformation matrix. The transformation may be inverted with the invert_air program and the volume may finally be resliced and interpolated with the reslice program.
