= Log-polar coordinates =

Coordinate system in two dimensions

In mathematics, log-polar coordinates (or logarithmic polar coordinates) is a coordinate system in two dimensions, where a point is identified by two numbers, one for the logarithm of the distance to a certain point, and one for an angle. Log-polar coordinates are closely connected to polar coordinates, which are usually used to describe domains in the plane with some sort of rotational symmetry. In areas like harmonic and complex analysis, the log-polar coordinates are more canonical than polar coordinates.

== Definition and coordinate transformations ==
Log-polar coordinates in the plane consist of a pair of real numbers (ρ,θ), where ρ is the logarithm of the distance between a given point and the origin and θ is the angle between a line of reference (the x-axis) and the line through the origin and the point. The angular coordinate is the same as for polar coordinates, while the radial coordinate is transformed according to the rule

$$r = e^\rho$$.

Where $r$ is the distance to the origin. The formulas for transformation from Cartesian coordinates to log-polar coordinates are given by

$$\begin{cases} \rho = \ln\left(\sqrt{ x^2 + y^2}\right), \\ \theta = \operatorname{atan2}(y,\, x). \end{cases}$$

and the formulas for transformation from log-polar to Cartesian coordinates are

$$\begin{cases}x = e^{\rho}\cos\theta, \\ y = e^{\rho}\sin\theta.\end{cases}$$

By using complex numbers (x, y) = x + iy, the latter transformation can be written as

$$x + iy =  e^{\rho+i\theta}$$

i.e. the complex exponential function. From this follows that basic equations in harmonic and complex analysis will have the same simple form as in Cartesian coordinates. This is not the case for polar coordinates.

== Some important equations in log-polar coordinates ==
=== Laplace's equation ===
Laplace's equation in two dimensions is given by

$$\frac{\partial^2 u}{\partial x^2} + \frac{\partial^2 u}{\partial y^2} = 0$$

in Cartesian coordinates. Writing the same equation in polar coordinates gives the more complicated equation

$$r\frac{\partial}{\partial r}\left(r\frac{\partial u}{\partial r}\right) + \frac{\partial^2 u}{\partial \theta^2} = 0$$

or equivalently

$$\left(r\frac{\partial}{\partial r}\right)^2 u + \frac{\partial^2 u}{\partial \theta^2} = 0$$

However, from the relation $r = e^\rho$ it follows that $r\frac{\partial}{\partial r} = \frac{\partial}{\partial \rho}$ so Laplace's equation in log-polar coordinates,

$$\frac{\partial^2 u}{\partial \rho^2} + \frac{\partial^2 u}{\partial \theta^2} = 0$$

has the same simple expression as in Cartesian coordinates. This is true for all coordinate systems where the transformation to Cartesian coordinates is given by a conformal mapping. Thus, when considering Laplace's equation for a part of the plane with rotational symmetry, e.g. a circular disk, log-polar coordinates is the natural choice.

=== Cauchy–Riemann equations ===
A similar situation arises when considering analytical functions. An analytical function $f(x,y) = u(x,y) + iv(x,y)$ written in Cartesian coordinates satisfies the Cauchy–Riemann equations:

$$\frac{\partial u}{\partial x} = \frac{\partial v}{\partial y},\ \ \ \ \ \ \frac{\partial u}{\partial y} = -\frac{\partial v}{\partial x}$$

If the function instead is expressed in polar form $f(re^{i\theta})=Re^{i\Phi}$, the Cauchy–Riemann equations take the more complicated form

$$r\frac{\partial \log R}{\partial r} = \frac{\partial \Phi}{\partial \theta},\ \ \ \ \ \ \frac{\partial \log R}{\partial \theta} = -r\frac{\partial \Phi}{\partial r},$$

Just as in the case with Laplace's equation, the simple form of Cartesian coordinates is recovered by changing polar into log-polar coordinates (let $P = \log R$):

$$\frac{\partial P}{\partial \rho} = \frac{\partial \Phi}{\partial \theta},\ \ \ \ \ \ \frac{\partial P}{\partial \theta} = -\frac{\partial \Phi}{\partial \rho}$$

The Cauchy–Riemann equations can also be written in one single equation as

$$\left(\frac{\partial}{\partial x} + i\frac{\partial}{\partial y}\right)f(x+iy) = 0$$

By expressing $\frac{\partial}{\partial x}$ and $\frac{\partial}{\partial y}$ in terms of $\frac{\partial}{\partial \rho}$ and $\frac{\partial}{\partial \theta}$ this equation can be written in the equivalent form

$$\left(\frac{\partial}{\partial \rho} + i\frac{\partial}{\partial \theta}\right)f(e^{\rho + i\theta}) = 0$$

=== Euler's equation ===
When one wants to solve the Dirichlet problem in a domain with rotational symmetry, the usual thing to do is to use the method of separation of variables for partial differential equations for Laplace's equation in polar form. This means that you write $u(r,\theta)=R(r)\Theta(\theta)$. Laplace's equation is then separated into two ordinary differential equations

$$\begin{cases} \Theta''(\theta) + \nu^2\Theta(\theta) = 0\\ r^2R''(r) + rR'(r)-\nu^2 R(r) = 0 \end{cases}$$

where $\nu$ is a constant. The first of these has constant coefficients and is easily solved. The second is a special case of Euler's equation

$$r^2R''(r) + c rR'(r) + d R(r) = 0$$

where $c, d$ are constants. This equation is usually solved by the ansatz $R(r) = r^{\lambda}$, but through use of log-polar radius, it can be changed into an equation with constant coefficients:

$$P''(\rho) + (c-1) P'(\rho) + d P(\rho) = 0$$

When considering Laplace's equation, $c = 1$ and $d = -\nu^2$ so the equation for $r$ takes the simple form

$$P''(\rho) - \nu^2 P(\rho) = 0$$

When solving the Dirichlet problem in Cartesian coordinates, these are exactly the equations for $x$ and $y$. Thus, once again the natural choice for a domain with rotational symmetry is not polar, but rather log-polar, coordinates.

== Discrete geometry ==
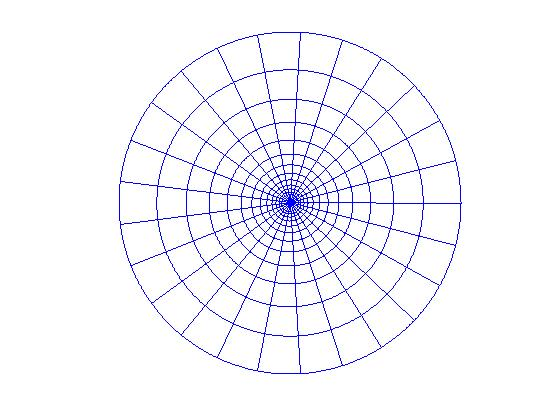
Discrete coordinate system in a circular disc given by log-polar coordinates (n = 25)

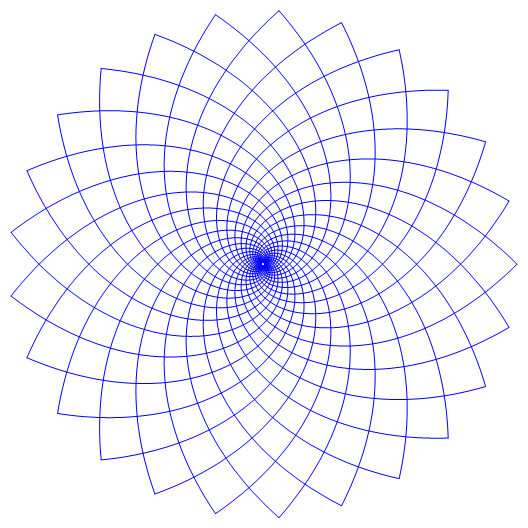
Discrete coordinate system in a circular disc that can easily be expressed in log-polar coordinates (n = 25)

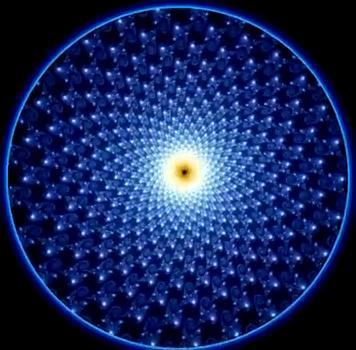
Part of a Mandelbrot fractal showing spiral behaviour

In order to solve a PDE numerically in a domain, a discrete coordinate system must be introduced in this domain. If the domain has rotational symmetry and you want a grid consisting of rectangles, polar coordinates are a poor choice, since in the center of the circle it gives rise to triangles rather than rectangles. However, this can be remedied by introducing log-polar coordinates in the following way. Divide the plane into a grid of squares with side length 2$\pi$/n, where n is a positive integer. Use the complex exponential function to create a log-polar grid in the plane. The left half-plane is then mapped onto the unit disc, with the number of radii equal to n. It can be even more advantageous to instead map the diagonals in these squares, which gives a discrete coordinate system in the unit disc consisting of spirals, see the figure to the right.

=== Dirichlet-to-Neumann operator ===
The latter coordinate system is for instance suitable for dealing with Dirichlet and Neumann problems. If the discrete coordinate system is interpreted as an undirected graph in the unit disc, it can be considered as a model for an electrical network. To every line segment in the graph is associated a conductance given by a function $\gamma$. The electrical network will then serve as a discrete model for the Dirichlet problem in the unit disc, where the Laplace equation takes the form of Kirchhoff's law. On the nodes on the boundary of the circle, an electrical potential (Dirichlet data) is defined, which induces an electric current (Neumann data) through the boundary nodes. The linear operator $\Lambda_\gamma$ from Dirichlet data to Neumann data is called a Dirichlet-to-Neumann operator, and depends on the topology and conductance of the network.

In the case with the continuous disc, it follows that if the conductance is homogeneous, let's say $\gamma = 1$ everywhere, then the Dirichlet-to-Neumann operator satisfies the following equation

$$\Lambda_\gamma^2 + \frac{\partial^2\ }{\partial\theta^2} = 0$$

=== Image analysis ===
Already at the end of the 1970s, applications for the discrete spiral coordinate system were given in image analysis (image registration). To represent an image in this coordinate system rather than in Cartesian coordinates, gives computational advantages when rotating or zooming in an image. Also, the photo receptors in the retina in the human eye are distributed in a way that has big similarities with the spiral coordinate system. It can also be found in the Mandelbrot fractal (see picture to the right).

Log-polar coordinates can also be used to construct fast methods for the Radon transform and its inverse.

== See also ==
- Polar coordinates
- Cartesian coordinates
- Cylindrical coordinates
- Spherical coordinates
- log-polar mapping in Retinotopy
