= Reverse Standards Conversion =

Novel method of converting from NTSC to PAL television video formats

Reverse Standards Conversion or RSC is a process developed by a team led by James Insell at the BBC for the restoration of video recordings which have already been converted between different video standards using early conversion techniques.

== Historical justifications for its use ==
Many programmes produced by the BBC in PAL in the 1960s and 1970s were converted to NTSC for distribution to 525 line markets. Because of the cost of video tape at the time, the original PAL master was often overwritten with new material or simply discarded. This often left the NTSC version as the only remaining copy.

== PAL to NTSC conversion (c. 1968) ==
PAL and NTSC have a differing number of lines of resolution and also use a different field rate. Traditional standards conversion techniques adopted interpolation as a way to cater for the differences between line resolution and field frequency.

What the original BBC converter tried to do (using the limited technology of the day) was to minimise judder by choosing either one 50 Hz field or a half-and-half mix of two 50 Hz fields, whichever was "nearer" to the temporal position of the target 60 Hz field. This gives a sequence like this (Nx = 60 Hz field x, Py = 50 Hz field y):

- N0 = P0 (ideal = 0, error = 0)
- N1 = P1 (ideal = 0.83, error = 0.17)
- N2 = (P1 + P2) / 2 (ideal = 1.67, error = -0.17)
- N3 = (P2 + P3) / 2 (ideal = 2.5, error = 0)
- N4 = (P3 + P4) / 2 (ideal = 3.33, error = 0.17)
- N5 = P4 (ideal = 4.17, error = -0.17)
- N6 = P5 (ideal = 5, error = 0, start of next group)

Simply taking the nearest raw field would produce a peak to peak "error" of 0.83, instead of 0.33.

This approach of interpolation results in some of the image data present in the PAL source material being merged between lines / fields of the resultant NTSC version.

== Double conversion problems ==
Attempts to convert the NTSC version back to PAL format using traditional conversion processes yielded unsatisfactory results. Such double conversions produce artifacts that manifest themselves as jerkiness in the picture where movement is present, and in soft-looking pictures.

Using interpolation processes to convert source material twice-over (in this example, PAL to NTSC to PAL) causes the artefacts previously mentioned to be exacerbated.

== Summary ==
RSC was developed as an alternative to double-conversion. Use of RSC bypasses the generation of the artefacts that would be introduced in a normal NTSC-to-PAL conversion, and actually reverses the early standards conversion method used to create the NTSC copies. RSC is the result of reverse engineering the method of conversion inherent in the old traditional BBC PAL to NTSC converter.

RSC attempts to separate the information from the merged lines and fields of the NTSC conversion. One of the problems inherent in this is that of increased noise. RSC employs techniques to minimise the resultant noise - both in the separation process itself, and in preparation of the NTSC material prior to processing through use of HF linear filtering.

== Programmes recovered by this process ==
Early examples of material processed for commercial re-release using RSC are the Doctor Who stories Inferno (1970) and The Claws of Axos (1971). The resulting DVD release of The Claws of Axos also contained a short documentary about the Reverse Standards Conversion process, presented by Jack Pizzey. It includes a split screen comparison between the source NTSC version and the final RSC processed version. The "Inferno" DVD does not feature this comparison. RSC was also used to restore the "Undertaker Sketch" from Monty Python's Flying Circus, which had been cut from the BBC's PAL master tape for being in (deliberately) bad taste.

== See also ==
- Television standards conversion
