= Wiener–Khinchin theorem =

Theorem relating stationary processes' autocorrelations and power spectra

In applied mathematics and statistics, the Wiener–Khinchin theorem or Wiener–Khintchine theorem, also known as the Wiener–Khinchin–Einstein theorem or the Khinchin–Kolmogorov theorem, states that the power spectral density of a wide-sense-stationary random process is equal to the Fourier transform of that process's autocorrelation function.

== History ==
Norbert Wiener proved this theorem for the case of a deterministic function in 1930; Aleksandr Khinchin later formulated an analogous result for stationary stochastic processes and published that probabilistic analogue in 1934. Albert Einstein explained, without proofs, the idea in a brief two-page memo in 1914.

== Continuous-time process ==
For continuous time, the Wiener–Khinchin theorem says that if $x$ is a wide-sense-stationary random process whose autocorrelation function $r$ defined in terms of statistical expected value
$$r_{xx}(\tau) = \mathbb{E}\big[x(t)x(t - \tau) ^* \big] < \infty, \quad \forall \tau,t \in \mathbb{R},$$
where the asterisk denotes complex conjugate, then there exists a monotone function $F(f)$ in the frequency domain $-\infty < f < \infty$, or equivalently a non negative Radon measure $\mu$ on the frequency domain, such that
$$r_{xx} (\tau) = \int_{-\infty}^\infty e^{2\pi i\tau f}\mu(df) = \int_{-\infty}^\infty e^{2\pi i\tau f}  dF(f)  ,$$
where the integral is a Riemann–Stieltjes integral. This is a kind of spectral decomposition of the auto-correlation function. $F$ is called the power spectral distribution function and is a statistical distribution function. It is sometimes called the integrated spectrum.

The ordinary Fourier transform of $x(t)$ does not exist in general, because stochastic random functions are usually not absolutely integrable. Nor is $r_{xx}$ assumed to be absolutely integrable, so it need not have a Fourier transform either.

However, if the measure $\mu(df) = dF(f)$ is absolutely continuous (e.g. if the process is purely indeterministic), then $F$ is differentiable almost everywhere and has a Radon-Nikodym derivative given by
$$S(f)= \frac{\mu(df)}{df}.$$
In this case, one can determine $S(f)$, the power spectral density of $x(t)$, by taking the averaged derivative of $F$. Because the left and right derivatives of $F$ exist everywhere, i.e. we can put
$$S(f) = \frac12 \left(\lim_{\varepsilon \downarrow 0} \frac1\varepsilon \big(F(f + \varepsilon) - F(f)\big) + \lim_{\varepsilon \uparrow 0} \frac1\varepsilon \big(F(f + \varepsilon) - F(f)\big)\right)$$
everywhere, (obtaining that F is the integral of its averaged derivative), and the theorem simplifies to
$$r_{xx} (\tau) = \int_{-\infty}^\infty  e^{2\pi i\tau f} \, S(f)df.$$
Assuming that $r$ and $S$ are "sufficiently nice" such that the Fourier inversion theorem is valid, the Wiener–Khinchin theorem takes the simple form of saying that $r$ and $S$ are a Fourier transform pair, and
$$S(f) = \int_{-\infty}^\infty r_{xx} (\tau)  e^{-2\pi if\tau} \,d\tau.$$

== Discrete-time process ==
For the discrete-time case, the power spectral density of the function with discrete values $x_n$ is

$$S(\omega)=\frac{1}{2\pi} \sum_{k=-\infty}^\infty r_{xx}(k)e^{-i \omega k}$$

where $\omega = 2 \pi f$ is the angular frequency, $i$ is used to denote the imaginary unit (in engineering, sometimes the letter $j$ is used instead) and $r_{xx}(k)$ is the discrete autocorrelation function of $x_n$, defined in its deterministic or stochastic formulation.

Provided $r_{xx}$ is absolutely summable, i.e.

$$\sum_{k=-\infty}^\infty |r_{xx}(k)| < +\infty$$

the result of the theorem then can be written as

$$r_{xx}(\tau) = \int_{-\pi}^{\pi} e^{i \tau \omega} S(\omega) d\omega$$

Being a discrete-time sequence, the spectral density is periodic in the frequency domain. For this reason, the domain of the function $S$ is usually restricted to $[-\pi, \pi]$ (note the interval is open from one side).

== Application ==
The theorem is useful for analyzing linear time-invariant systems (LTI systems) when the inputs and outputs are not square-integrable, so their Fourier transforms do not exist. A corollary is that the Fourier transform of the autocorrelation function of the output of an LTI system is equal to the product of the Fourier transform of the autocorrelation function of the input of the system times the squared magnitude of the Fourier transform of the system impulse response. This works even when the Fourier transforms of the input and output signals do not exist because these signals are not square-integrable, so the system inputs and outputs cannot be directly related by the Fourier transform of the impulse response.

Since the Fourier transform of the autocorrelation function of a signal is the power spectrum of the signal, this corollary is equivalent to saying that the power spectrum of the output is equal to the power spectrum of the input times the energy transfer function.

This corollary is used in the parametric method for power spectrum estimation.

== Discrepancies in terminology ==
In many textbooks and in much of the technical literature, it is tacitly assumed that Fourier inversion of the autocorrelation function and the power spectral density is valid, and the Wiener–Khinchin theorem is stated, very simply, as if it said that the Fourier transform of the autocorrelation function was equal to the power spectral density, ignoring all questions of convergence (similar to Einstein's paper). But the theorem (as stated here) was applied by Norbert Wiener and Aleksandr Khinchin to the sample functions (signals) of wide-sense-stationary random processes, signals whose Fourier transforms do not exist. Wiener's contribution was to make sense of the spectral decomposition of the autocorrelation function of a sample function of a wide-sense-stationary random process even when the integrals for the Fourier transform and Fourier inversion do not make sense.

Further complicating the issue is that the discrete Fourier transform always exists for digital, finite-length sequences, meaning that the theorem can be blindly applied to calculate autocorrelations of numerical sequences. As mentioned earlier, the relation of this discrete sampled data to a mathematical model is often misleading, and related errors can show up as a divergence when the sequence length is modified.

Some authors refer to $R$ as the autocovariance function. They then proceed to normalize it by dividing by $R(0)$, to obtain what they refer to as the autocorrelation function.
