= Autocovariance =

Concept in probability and statistics

In probability theory and statistics, given a stochastic process, the autocovariance is a function that gives the covariance of the process with itself at pairs of time points. Autocovariance is closely related to the autocorrelation of the process in question.

== Auto-covariance of stochastic processes ==
=== Definition ===
With the usual notation $\operatorname{E}$ for the expectation operator, if the stochastic process $\left\{X_t\right\}$ has the mean function $\mu_t = \operatorname{E}[X_t]$, then the autocovariance is given by

$\operatorname{K}_{XX}(t_1,t_2) = \operatorname{cov}\left[X_{t_1}, X_{t_2}\right] = \operatorname{E}[(X_{t_1} - \mu_{t_1})(X_{t_2} - \mu_{t_2})] = \operatorname{E}[X_{t_1} X_{t_2}] - \mu_{t_1} \mu_{t_2}$	Eq.1

where $t_1$ and $t_2$ are two instances in time.

=== Definition for weakly stationary process ===
If $\left\{X_t\right\}$ is a weakly stationary (WSS) process, then the following are true:

$\mu_{t_1} = \mu_{t_2} \triangleq \mu$ for all $t_1,t_2$

and

$\operatorname{E}[|X_t|^2] < \infty$ for all $t$

and

$$\operatorname{K}_{XX}(t_1,t_2) = \operatorname{K}_{XX}(t_2 - t_1,0) \triangleq \operatorname{K}_{XX}(t_2 - t_1) = \operatorname{K}_{XX}(\tau),$$

where $\tau = t_2 - t_1$ is the lag time, or the amount of time by which the signal has been shifted.

The autocovariance function of a WSS process is therefore given by:

$\operatorname{K}_{XX}(\tau) = \operatorname{E}[(X_t - \mu_t)(X_{t- \tau} - \mu_{t- \tau})] = \operatorname{E}[X_t X_{t-\tau}] - \mu_t \mu_{t-\tau}$	Eq.2

which is equivalent to

$$\operatorname{K}_{XX}(\tau) = \operatorname{E}[(X_{t+ \tau} - \mu_{t +\tau})(X_{t} - \mu_{t})] = \operatorname{E}[X_{t+\tau} X_t] - \mu^2$$.

=== Normalization ===
It is common practice in some disciplines (e.g. statistics and time series analysis) to normalize the autocovariance function to get a time-dependent Pearson correlation coefficient. However in other disciplines (e.g. engineering) the normalization is usually dropped and the terms "autocorrelation" and "autocovariance" are used interchangeably.

The definition of the normalized auto-correlation of a stochastic process is

$$\rho_{XX}(t_1,t_2) = \frac{\operatorname{K}_{XX}(t_1,t_2)}{\sigma_{t_1}\sigma_{t_2}} = \frac{\operatorname{E}[(X_{t_1} - \mu_{t_1})(X_{t_2} - \mu_{t_2})]}{\sigma_{t_1}\sigma_{t_2}}$$.

If the function $\rho_{XX}$ is well-defined, its value must lie in the range $[-1,1]$, with 1 indicating perfect correlation and −1 indicating perfect anti-correlation.

For a WSS process, the definition is

$$\rho_{XX}(\tau) = \frac{\operatorname{K}_{XX}(\tau)}{\sigma^2} = \frac{\operatorname{E}[(X_t - \mu)(X_{t+\tau} - \mu)]}{\sigma^2}$$.

where

$$\operatorname{K}_{XX}(0) = \sigma^2$$.

=== Properties ===
==== Symmetry property ====
$\operatorname{K}_{XX}(t_1,t_2) = \overline{\operatorname{K}_{XX}(t_2,t_1)}$

respectively for a WSS process:

$\operatorname{K}_{XX}(\tau) = \overline{\operatorname{K}_{XX}(-\tau)}$

==== Linear filtering ====
The autocovariance of a linearly filtered process $\left\{Y_t\right\}$

$$Y_t = \sum_{k=-\infty}^\infty a_k X_{t+k}\,$$

is

$$K_{YY}(\tau) = \sum_{k,l=-\infty}^\infty a_k a_l K_{XX}(\tau+k-l).\,$$

== Calculating turbulent diffusivity ==
Autocovariance can be used to calculate turbulent diffusivity. Turbulence in a flow can cause the fluctuation of velocity in space and time. Thus, we are able to identify turbulence through the statistics of those fluctuations.

Reynolds decomposition is used to define the velocity fluctuations $u'(x,t)$ (assume we are now working with 1D problem and $U(x,t)$ is the velocity along $x$ direction):

$$U(x,t) = \langle U(x,t) \rangle + u'(x,t),$$

where $U(x,t)$ is the true velocity, and $\langle U(x,t) \rangle$ is the expected value of velocity. If we choose a correct $\langle U(x,t) \rangle$, all of the stochastic components of the turbulent velocity will be included in $u'(x,t)$. To determine $\langle U(x,t) \rangle$, a set of velocity measurements that are assembled from points in space, moments in time or repeated experiments is required.

If we assume the turbulent flux $\langle u'c' \rangle$ ($c' = c - \langle c \rangle$, and c is the concentration term) can be caused by a random walk, we can use Fick's laws of diffusion to express the turbulent flux term:

$$J_{\text{turbulence}_x} = \langle u'c' \rangle \approx D_{T_x} \frac{\partial \langle c \rangle}{\partial x}.$$

The velocity autocovariance is defined as

$K_{XX} \equiv \langle u'(t_0) u'(t_0 + \tau)\rangle$ or $K_{XX} \equiv \langle u'(x_0) u'(x_0 + r)\rangle,$

where $\tau$ is the lag time, and $r$ is the lag distance.

The turbulent diffusivity $D_{T_x}$ can be calculated using the following 3 methods:

1. If we have velocity data along a Lagrangian trajectory:
  $$D_{T_x} = \int_\tau^\infty u'(t_0) u'(t_0 + \tau) \,d\tau.$$
2. If we have velocity data at one fixed (Eulerian) location:
  $$D_{T_x} \approx [0.3 \pm 0.1] \left[\frac{\langle u'u' \rangle + \langle u \rangle^2}{\langle u'u' \rangle}\right] \int_\tau^\infty u'(t_0) u'(t_0 + \tau) \,d\tau.$$
3. If we have velocity information at two fixed (Eulerian) locations:
  $$D_{T_x} \approx [0.4 \pm 0.1] \left[\frac{1}{\langle u'u' \rangle}\right] \int_r^\infty u'(x_0) u'(x_0 + r) \,dr,$$
  where $r$ is the distance separated by these two fixed locations.

== See also ==
- Autoregressive process
- Correlation
- Cross-covariance
- Cross-correlation
- Noise covariance estimation (as an application example)
