= PLplot =

Scientific plotting library

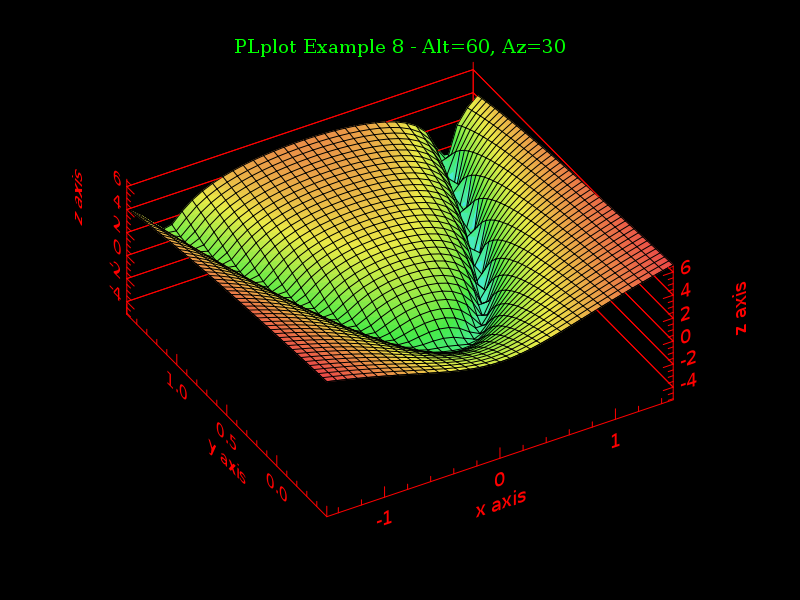
- 3D surface plot rendered by PLplot
- Stable release: 5.15.0 / June 1, 2019; 6 years ago
- Repository: sourceforge.net/p/plplot/plplot/ci/master/tree/
- Written in: C
- Platform: Cross-platform
- Type: Plotting
- License: LGPL
- Website: plplot.sourceforge.net

PLplot is a library of subroutines that are often used to make scientific plots in compiled languages such as C, C++, D, Fortran, Ada, OCaml and Java. The library also exists as an unofficial binding for the .NET runtime. PLplot can also be used interactively by interpreted languages such as Octave, Python, Perl and Tcl. The current version was written primarily by Maurice J. LeBrun and Geoffrey Furnish.

3D image made with C and PLplot

== License ==
PLplot is free software and is licensed under the LGPL.

== See also ==
- Matplotlib
- Gnuplot
- Pyxplot
- Grace
- DISLIN
- PGPLOT
