= Seeq =

Seeq may refer to:

- Seeq Technology, a semiconductor company founded in 1981 and sold to LSI Corporation in 1999
- SEEQ Card, an electronic smartcard ticketing system used on the Translink (Queensland) network
- A race in the fictional universe setting Ivalice
- Seeq Corporation, a data analytics software company founded in 2013

== See also ==
- SeeqPod
