= Simul =

Simul may refer to:

- A shortened form of simultaneous exhibition
- SIMUL, a statistics software
