= Topographic map =

Medium to large scale map that shows a precise map of the terrain

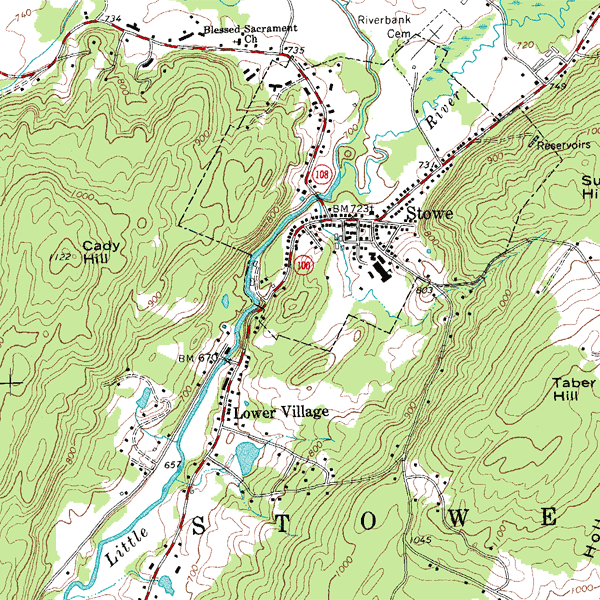
A topographic map of Stowe, Vermont with contour lines

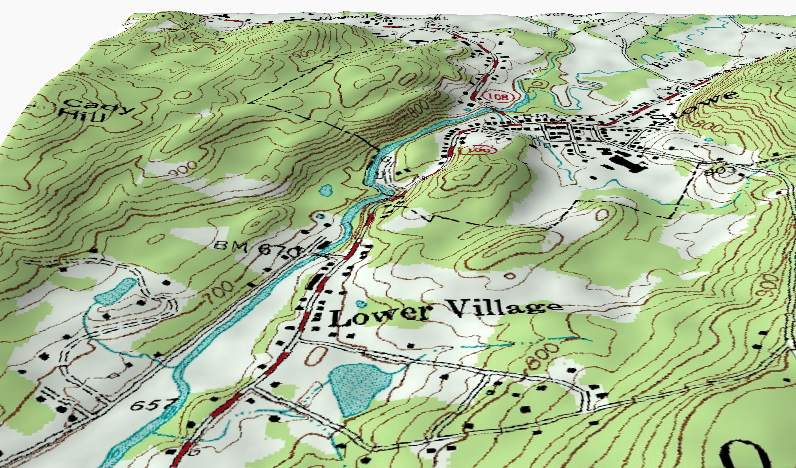
Part of the same map in a perspective shaded relief view illustrating how the contour lines follow the terrain

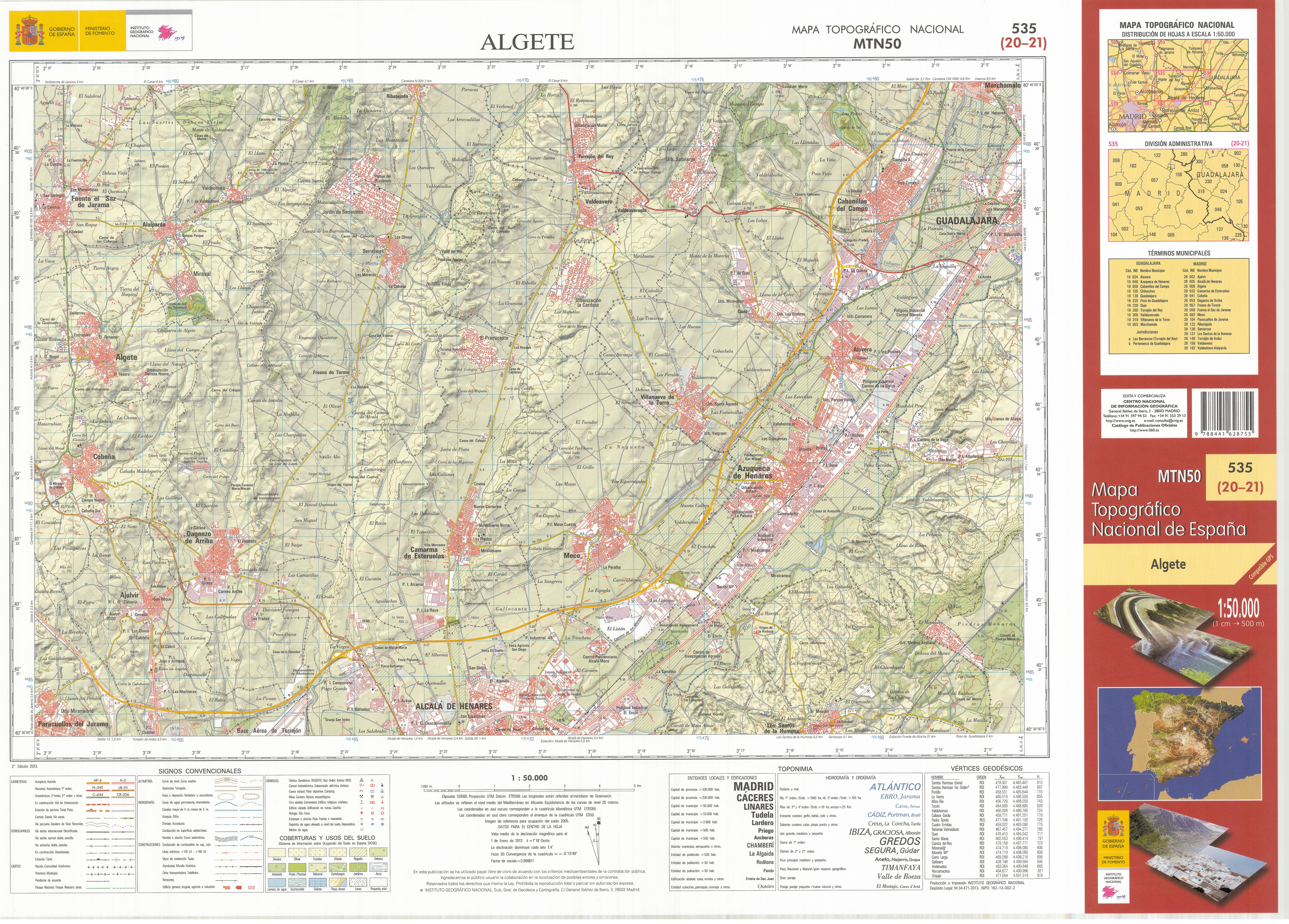
Sheet #535 (2013 version; second digital edition) of MTN50 Spanish National Topographic map series, covering Algete town (near Madrid) and its surroundings.

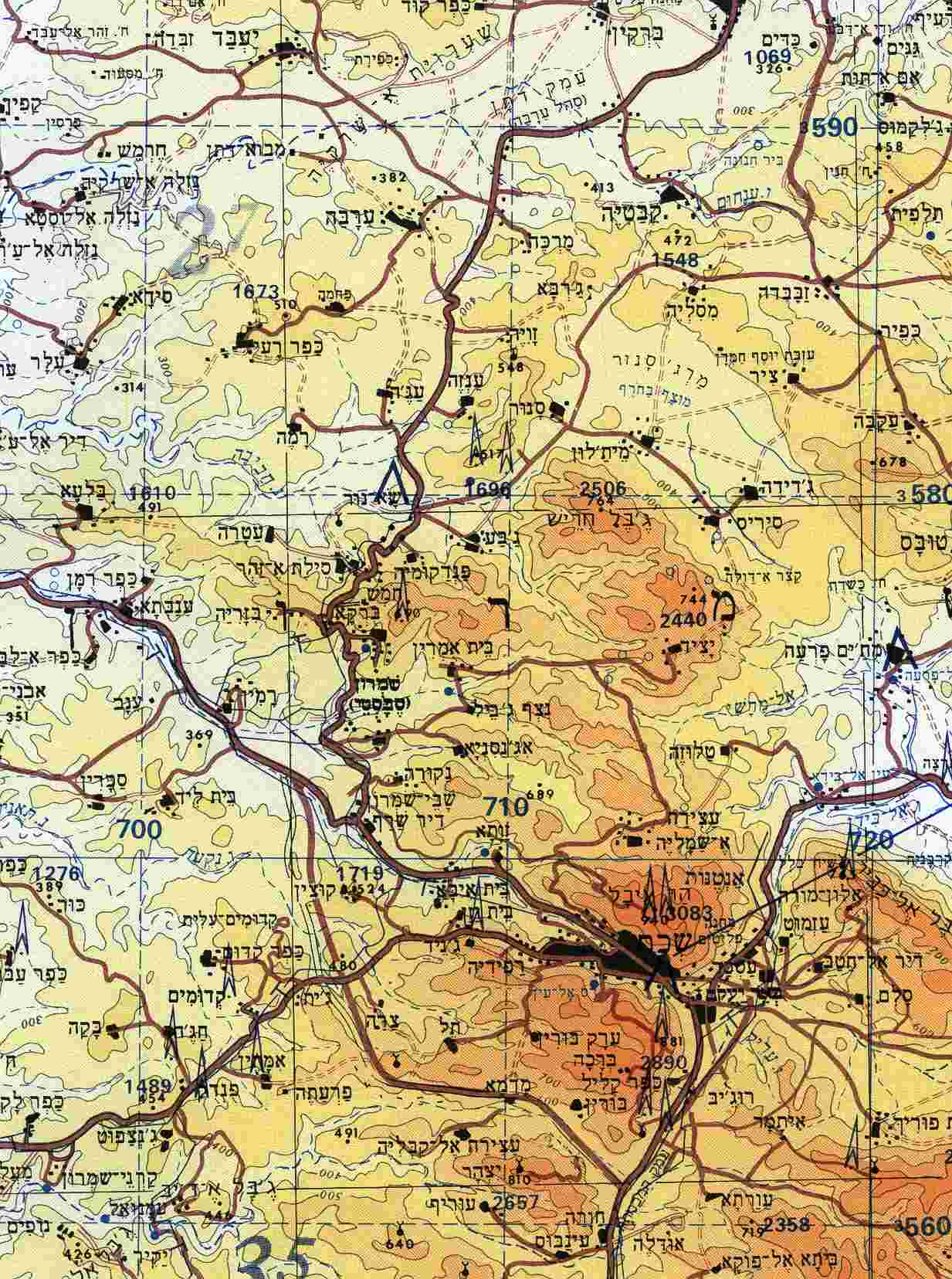
Section of topographical map of Nablus area (West Bank) with contour lines at 100-meter intervals. Heights are colour-coded.

In modern mapping, a topographic map or topographic sheet is a type of map characterized by large-scale detail and quantitative representation of relief features, usually using contour lines (connecting points of equal elevation), but historically using a variety of methods. Traditional definitions require a topographic map to show both natural and artificial features. A topographic survey is typically based upon a systematic observation and published as a map series, made up of two or more map sheets that combine to form the whole map. A topographic map series uses a common specification that includes the range of cartographic symbols employed, as well as a standard geodetic framework that defines the map projection, coordinate system, ellipsoid and geodetic datum. Official topographic maps also adopt a national grid referencing system.

Natural Resources Canada provides this description of topographic maps:

These maps depict in detail ground relief (landforms and terrain), drainage (lakes and rivers), forest cover, administrative areas, populated areas, transportation routes and facilities (including roads and railways), and other man-made features.

Other authors define topographic maps by contrasting them with another type of map; they are distinguished from smaller-scale "chorographic maps" that cover large regions, "planimetric maps" that do not show elevations, and "thematic maps" that focus on specific topics.

However, in the vernacular and day to day world, the representation of relief (contours) is popularly held to define the genre, such that even small-scale maps showing relief are commonly (and erroneously, in the technical sense) called "topographic".

The study or discipline of topography is a much broader field of study, which takes into account all natural and human-made features of terrain. Maps were among the first artifacts to record observations about topography.

== History ==
Topographic maps are based on topographical surveys. Performed at large scales, these surveys are called topographical in the old sense of topography, showing a variety of elevations and landforms. This is in contrast to older cadastral surveys, which primarily show property and governmental boundaries. The first multi-sheet topographic map series of an entire country, the Carte géométrique de la France, was completed in 1789. The Great Trigonometric Survey of India, started by the East India Company in 1802, then taken over by the British Raj after 1857 was notable as a successful effort on a larger scale and for accurately determining heights of Himalayan peaks from viewpoints over one hundred miles distant.

Global indexing system first developed for International Map of the World

Topographic surveys were prepared by the military to assist in planning for battle and for defensive emplacements (thus the name and history of the United Kingdom's Ordnance Survey). As such, elevation information was of vital importance.

As they evolved, topographic map series became a national resource in modern nations in planning infrastructure and resource exploitation. In the United States, the national map-making function which had been shared by both the Army Corps of Engineers and the Department of the Interior migrated to the newly created United States Geological Survey in 1879, where it has remained since.

1913 saw the beginning of the International Map of the World initiative, which set out to map all of Earth's significant land areas at a scale of 1:1 million, on about one thousand sheets, each covering four degrees latitude by six or more degrees longitude. Excluding borders, each sheet was 44 cm high and (depending on latitude) up to 66 cm wide. Although the project eventually foundered, it left an indexing system that remains in use.

By the 1980s, centralized printing of standardized topographic maps began to be superseded by databases of coordinates that could be used on computers by moderately skilled end users to view or print maps with arbitrary contents, coverage and scale. For example, the federal government of the United States' TIGER initiative compiled interlinked databases of federal, state and local political borders and census enumeration areas, and of roadways, railroads, and water features with support for locating street addresses within street segments. TIGER was developed in the 1980s and used in the 1990 and subsequent decennial censuses. Digital elevation models (DEM) were also compiled, initially from topographic maps and stereographic interpretation of aerial photographs and then from satellite photography and radar data. Since all these were government projects funded with taxes and not classified for national security reasons, the datasets were in the public domain and freely usable without fees or licensing.

TIGER and DEM datasets greatly facilitated geographic information systems and made the Global Positioning System much more useful by providing context around locations given by the technology as coordinates. Initial applications were mostly professionalized forms such as innovative surveying instruments and agency-level GIS systems tended by experts. By the mid-1990s, increasingly user-friendly resources such as online mapping in two and three dimensions, integration of GPS with mobile phones and automotive navigation systems appeared. As of 2011, the future of standardized, centrally printed topographical maps is left somewhat in doubt.

== Uses ==
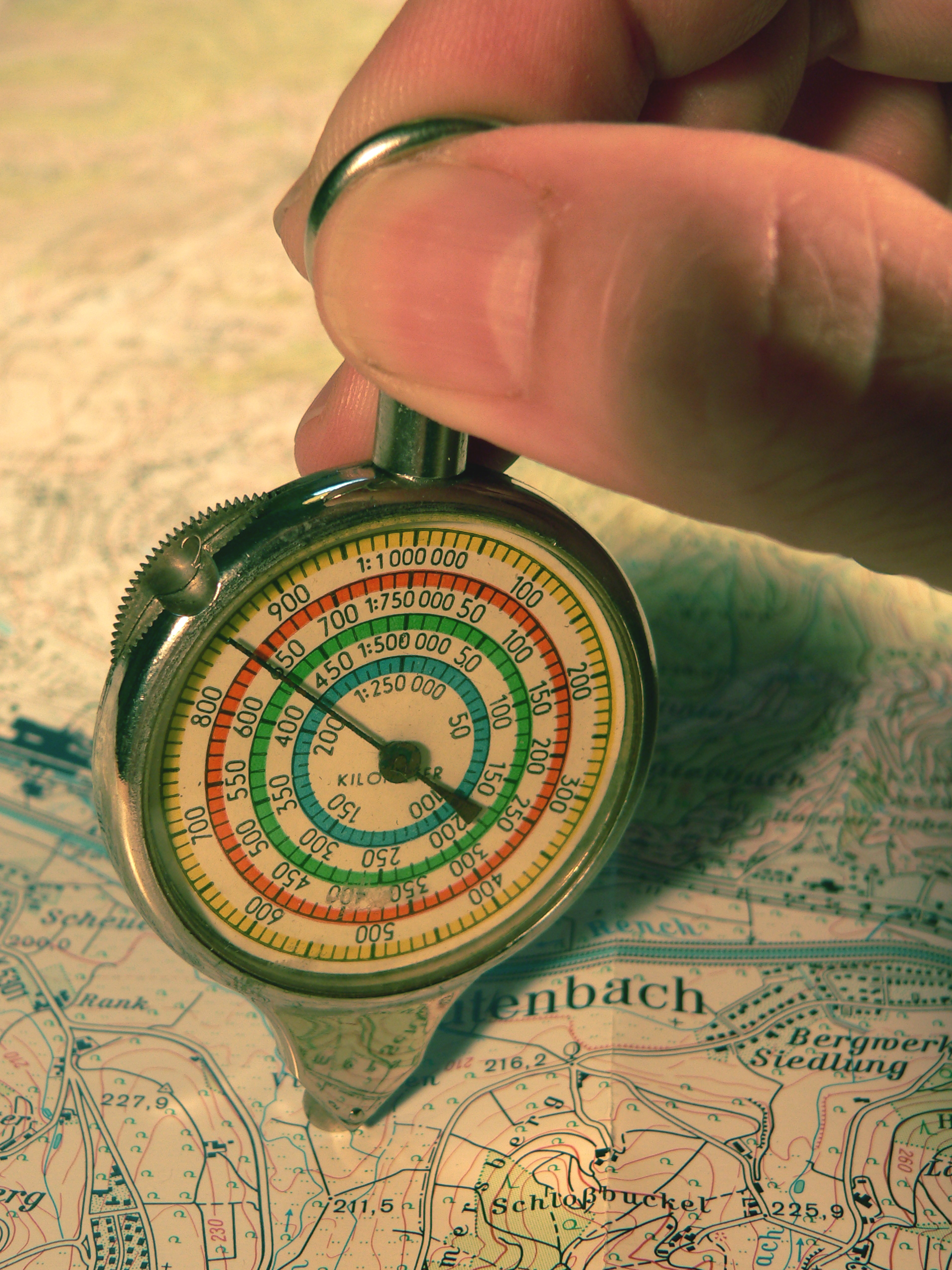
Curvimeter used to measure a distance on a topographic map

Topographic maps have many multiple uses in the present day: any type of geographic planning or large-scale architecture; Earth sciences and many other geographic disciplines; mining and other Earth-based endeavours; civil engineering and recreational uses such as hiking and orienteering.

It takes practice and skill to read and interpret a topographic map. This includes not only how to identify map features, but also how to interpret contour lines to infer landforms like cliffs, ridges, draws, etc. Training in map reading is often given in orienteering, scouting, and the military.

== Conventions ==
The various features shown on the map are represented by conventional signs or symbols. For example, colors can be used to indicate a classification of roads. These signs are usually explained in the margin of the map, or on a separately published characteristic sheet.

Topographic maps are also commonly called contour maps or topo maps. In the United States, where the primary national series is organized by a strict 7.5-minute grid, they are often called either quads or quadrangles.

Topographic maps conventionally show topography, or land contours, by means of contour lines. Contour lines are curves that connect contiguous points of the same altitude (isohypse). In other words, every point on the marked line of 100 m elevation is 100 m above mean sea level.

These maps usually show not only the contours, but also any significant streams or other bodies of water, forest cover, built-up areas or individual buildings (depending on scale), and other features and points of interest such as what direction those streams are flowing.

Most topographic maps were prepared using photogrammetric interpretation of aerial photography using a stereoplotter. Modern mapping also employs lidar and other Remote sensing techniques. Older topographic maps were prepared using traditional surveying instruments.

The cartographic style (content and appearance) of topographic maps is highly variable between national mapping organizations. Aesthetic traditions and conventions persist in topographic map symbology, particularly amongst European countries at medium map scales.

== Publishers of national topographic map series ==
Although virtually the entire terrestrial surface of Earth has been mapped at scale 1:1,000,000, medium and large-scale mapping has been accomplished intensively in some countries and much less in others. Several commercial vendors supply international topographic map series.

According to 2007/2/EC European directive, national mapping agencies of European Union countries must have publicly available services for searching, viewing and downloading their official map series. Topographic maps produced by some of them are available under a free license that allows re-use, such as a Creative Commons license.

== See also ==
- Aeronautical chart
- Bathymetric chart
- Cadastral map
- Thematic map
- Hypsometric tints
- International Map of the World
- (List of) national mapping agencies
- Nautical chart
- Raised-relief map
- Stereoplotter
- Topo (climbing)
- TopoFusion
- Topographic profile
