= Christian M. Ringle =

German academic

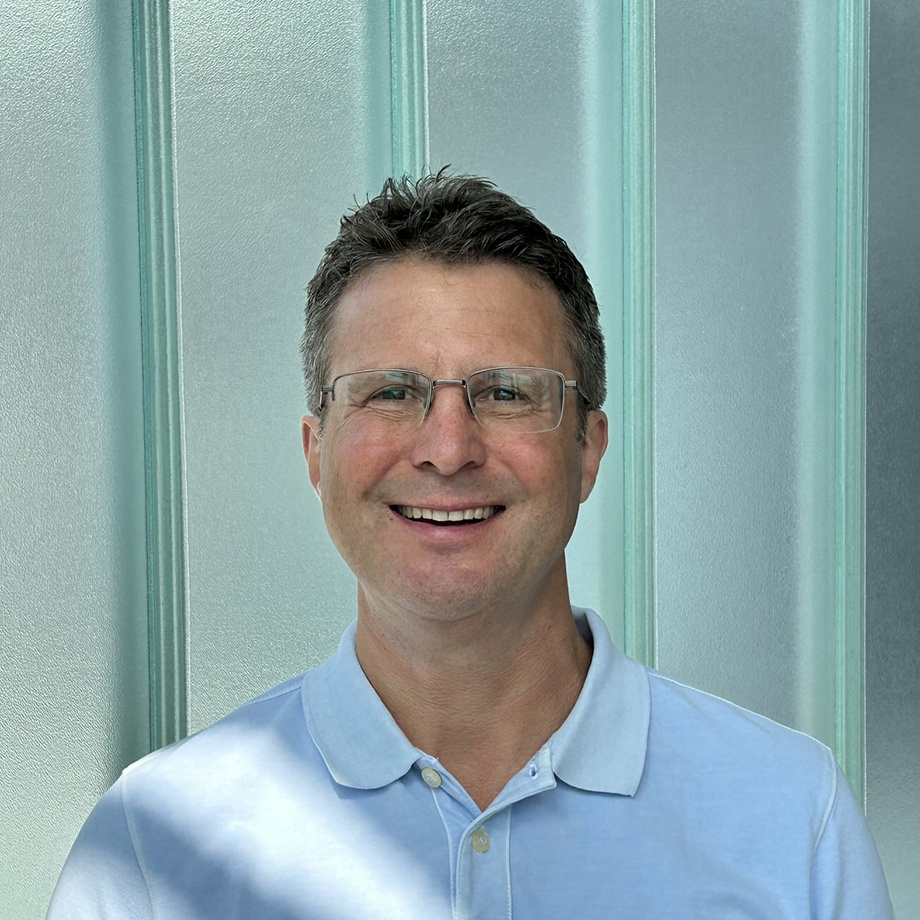
- Born: Germany
- Known for: Methods-based research in economics and business; co-developer and co-founder of SmartPLS
- Awards: Included in Clarivate Analytics' Highly Cited Researchers list (Economics & Business; since 2018)
- Scientific career
- Fields: Management and decision sciences, Business research methods, Business analytics
- Institutions: Hamburg University of Technology (TUHH), James Cook University (adjunct), University of California, Berkeley (visiting)
- Website: www.tuhh.de/mds/team/prof-dr-c-m-ringle.html

Christian M. Ringle is a German management scholar and quantitative methods researcher. He is a Chaired Professor of Management and Decision Sciences at the Hamburg University of Technology and a co-founder of the statistical software SmartPLS.

== Education and career ==
He completed his doctoral studies at the University of Hamburg, where he earned a PhD in business research methodology.

Ringle joined the faculty at the Hamburg University of Technology, where he holds a Chaired Professorship in Management and Decision Sciences. He serves as Director of the Institute of Management and Decision Sciences, leading research and teaching initiatives in quantitative methods, analytics, and organisational research.

Ringle has held visiting and adjunct academic appointments at James Cook University, the National University of Malaysia, and the University of California, Berkeley.

In addition to his academic role, Ringle has played an active part in the development and dissemination of methodological tools, particularly through the SmartPLS software project, which supports researchers across disciplines in estimating complex structural models.

== Research ==
Ringle’s research encompasses management, marketing, strategic decision making, organisational behaviour, and innovation management, with a strong emphasis on the development and application of quantitative research methods. Through his methodological work, he has promoted the use of partial least squares structural equation modeling (PLS‑SEM) as a rigorous, flexible approach to analysing multivariate relationships in business and social science research.

His scholarly articles have appeared in high‑impact peer‑reviewed journals, including Information Systems Research, International Journal of Research in Marketing, Journal of the Academy of Marketing Science, MIS Quarterly, Journal of Business Research, and Organizational Research Methods. These publications address both methodological innovations and substantive applications of quantitative models in empirical research.

SmartPLS and Methodological Impact

In 2014, Ringle co‑founded SmartPLS, a graphical software package that implements PLS‑SEM for researchers who require robust, variance‑based structural equation modeling without extensive programming. SmartPLS has been adopted by academic researchers, consultants and corporate analysts worldwide, supporting modelling in areas such as marketing research, organisational strategy, consumer behaviour and innovation studies.

Ringle’s work on SmartPLS and his associated methodological literature has significantly influenced how quantitative methods are taught and applied in business schools and research institutions. His contributions have helped bridge the gap between complex statistical techniques and practical empirical research.
