= SuperCROSS =

Tabulation software

SuperCROSS is a desktop tabulation software tool used by statisticians for aggregating and cross-tabulating data from surveys. It does not require programming expertise, but offers a windows based environment and a drag-and-drop graphical interface. It is a product of the SuperSTAR Suite licensed by Space Time Research, a software development firm located in Melbourne Australia who have worked with the Australian Bureau of Statistics since 1986.

Other statistical organisations using SuperCROSS as at August 2014 include:

- The Cancer Council Victoria Visit Website
- Tourism Research Australia Austrade
- National Centre for Vocational Educational Research
- Statistics New Zealand
- Fachstelle fur Statistik Kanton St. Gallen
- Kuwait Authority for Civil Information
- King Faisal Specialist Hospital & Research Center
- Northern Ireland Statistics and Research Agency
- National Records of Scotland
- Swiss Federal Office for Building & Logistics
- Bureau of Economic Analysis Foundation
- Bundesanstalt Statistik Osterreich
- Amt fur Statistik Berlin-Brandenburg
- Statistics Finland
- Statistics South Africa
- Statistics Sweden
- US Census

== Software Features ==
- Ad hoc Analysis
- Cross tabulation
- Hierarchical Classification Support
- Survey support – using replicate and standard weights
- Metadata
- Output formats include Excel, HTML, XML and CSV
