= JMulTi =

Open-source interactive software for econometric analysis

- Developer: The JMulTi Team
- Stable release: 4.23 / July 23, 2008; 17 years ago
- Operating system: Linux, Windows
- Platform: Java
- Type: econometrics software
- License: GPL
- Website: www.jmulti.com

JMulTi is an open-source interactive software for econometric analysis, specialised in univariate and multivariate time series analysis. It has a Java graphical user interface.

The motivation for its designed was to provide the means by which some time-series econometric procedures that were difficult or unavailable in other packages could be undertaken. Such procedures include Impulse Response Analysis with bootstrapped confidence intervals for VAR/VEC modelling.

== See also ==
- gretl
- Comparison of statistical packages
