= TinkerPlots =

Data exploration software

- Developers: Clifford Konold and Craig D. Miller
- Stable release: 3.0.36 / October 2023
- Operating system: Mac OS X, Windows
- Type: Educational software
- License: Proprietary
- Website: Official website

TinkerPlots is exploratory data analysis and modeling software designed for use by students in grades 4 through university. It was designed by Clifford Konold and Craig Miller at the University of Massachusetts Amherst and is currently published by Learn Troop. It runs on Windows XP or later and Mac OS 10.4 or later. The program allows users to enter their own data, to import them from other applications or the Web, or to generate them using a sampling engine. The program also comes with 50 multivariate data sets.

Using TinkerPlots, students can make a large variety of graphs, including those specified for middle school in Common Core State Standards for Mathematics But rather than making these graphs directly using commands, students construct them by progressively organizing cases using basic operations including "stack," "order," and "separate." Responding to these operations, case icons animate into different screen positions. The interface was based on observations of people organizing "data cards" on a table to make graphs to answer specific questions

Innovations of TinkerPlots include using a superimposed color gradient to detect covariation in two numeric attributes and a "hat plot," a reformulated and generalized version of the box plot.

The latest version is 3.0.37. This version does not have substantively different features from versions 2.1, 2.2 or 2.3, but is a complete re-write in a code sense, and has a number of bug fixes and enhancements to remain compatible with the latest versions of Windows and MacOS.

== Additional References ==
- Bakker, A., Derry, J., & Konold, C. (2006). Using technology to support diagrammatic reasoning about center and variation. In A. Rossman & B. Chance (Eds.) Proceedings of the 7th International Conference on Teaching Statistics (ICOTS) CD-ROM. Salvador, Bahai, Brazil, July 2–7, 2006.
- Friel, S. (2002). "Wooden or steal roller coasters: What's the choice?". New England Journal of Mathematics. 34: 40–54.
- Hoyles, C.; Bakker, A.; Kent, P.; Noss, R. (2007). "Attributing meanings to representations of data: The case of statistical process control". Mathematical Thinking and Learning. 9 (4): 331–360. doi:10.1080/10986060701533326. S2CID 3150858.
- Konold, C., & Lehrer, R. (in press). Technology and mathematics education: An essay in honor of Jim Kaput. In L. English (Ed.), Handbook of International Research in Mathematics Education, (2nd edition). New York: Routledge.
- Rubin, A. (2007). "Much has changed; little has changed: Revisiting the role of technology in statistics education 1992-2007". Technology Innovations in Statistics Education. 1 (1): Article 6. doi:10.5070/T511000027.
- Rubin, A., Hammerman, J., & Konold, C. (2006). Exploring informal inference with interactive visualization software. In A. Rossman & B. Chance (Eds.) Proceedings of the 7th International Conference on Teaching Statistics (ICOTS) CD-ROM. Salvador, Bahai, Brazil, July 2–7, 2006.

== Educational Materials using TinkerPlots ==
- Konold, C. (2005). Exploring Data with TinkerPlots. Key Curriculum Press, ISBN 1-55953-750-7. Contents: Getting Started, Learning TinkerPlots, Teaching with TinkerPlots, Activities, Activity Notes.
- Brodesky, A., Doherty, A., & Stoddard, J. (2008). Digging into Data with TinkerPlots. Key Curriculum Press, 225 pp. ISBN 978-1-55953-885-5. Contents: (1) Comparisons, Distributions, and Line Plots: Exploring Data about Cats, (2) Comparisons and Boxplots: Investigating Data about Middle-School Students, (3) Comparisons using Formulas: Investigating Data about Signatures and Words, (4) Measures of Center and Histograms: Analyzing Safety Data, (5) Relationships between Attributes and Scatter Plots: Investigating Sports Data.
- Walsh, T. (2009). The Survey Toolkit: Collecting Information, Analyzing Data, and Writing Reports. Contents: Choosing a Research Question, Developing and Giving the Survey, Analyzing Survey Data, Sharing Results. 112pp. ISBN 978-1-55953-886-2.
- TinkerPlots Instructional Movies (2010). These 10 short movies where developed by the Statistics Education Research Group in 2010, and published with TinkerPlots, in QuickTime and AVI format. Titles: TinkerPlots Basics, Adding Data, Making Common Graphs, Comparing Groups, Exploring Relationships 1, Exploring Relationships 2, Building a Data Factory, Simulating Group Differences, Probabilities Simulation, Creating Sample Spaces
- TinkerPlots Workshop Guide (2007). ISBN 978-1-55953-961-6.
- TinkerPlots Walkthrough Guide and Quick Reference Card (included in Instructors Evaluation Edition).
- Free TinkerPlots Activities and Resources on Key Curriculum Website
- Free TinkerPlots Activities and Resources on University of Massachusetts Website
