= JASP =

Free and open-source statistical program

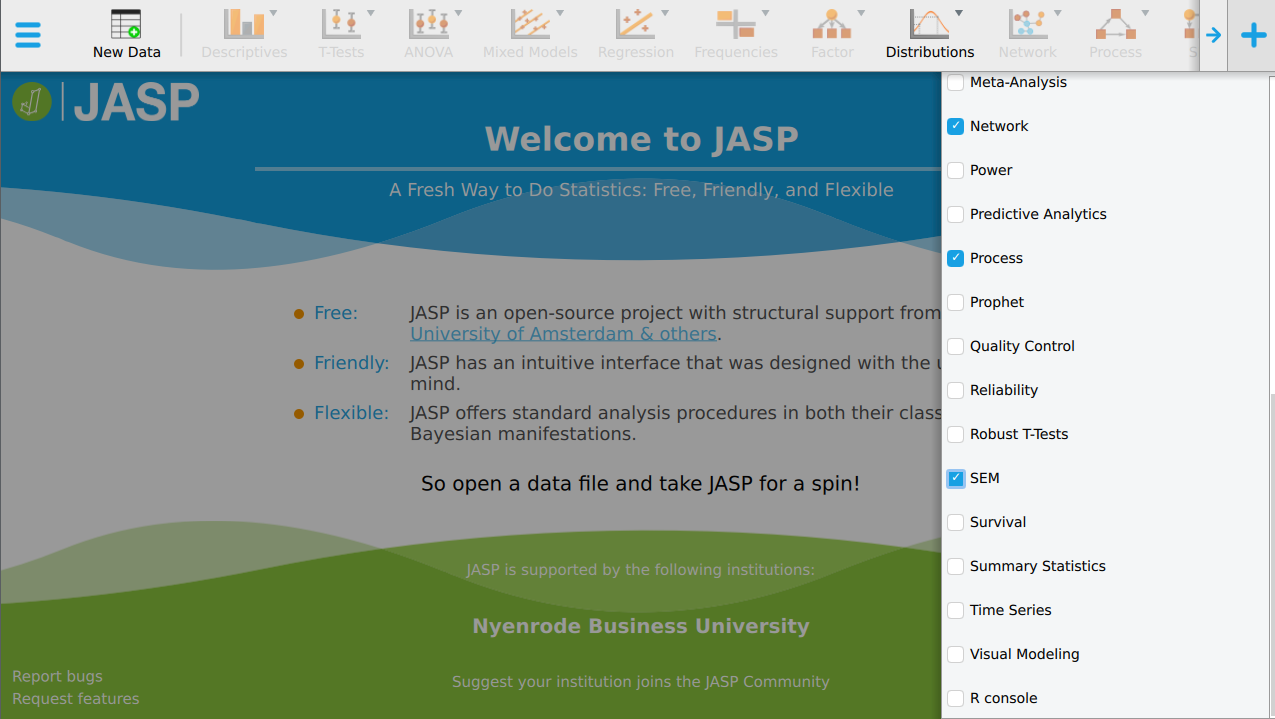
- JASP landing page and module selection
- Stable release: 0.96.0 / 4 March 2026; 3 months ago
- Written in: C++, R, JavaScript, QML
- Operating system: Linux; macOS; Windows; ChromeOS
- Platform: x86-64
- Available in: 16 languages
- Type: Statistics
- License: GNU Affero General Public License
- Website: jasp-stats.org
- Repository: https://github.com/jasp-stats/

JASP is a free and open-source program for statistical analysis supported by the University of Amsterdam. It is designed to be easy to use, and familiar to users of SPSS. It offers standard analysis procedures in both their classical and Bayesian form. JASP generally produces APA style results tables and plots to ease publication. It promotes open science via integration with the Open Science Framework and reproducibility by integrating the analysis settings into the results. The development of JASP is financially supported by sponsors, several universities, and research funds.

== Overview ==
In recognition of Bayesian pioneer Sir Harold Jeffreys, JASP stands for Jeffreys’s Amazing Statistics Program.

== Analyses ==
JASP offers frequentist inference and Bayesian inference on the same statistical models. Frequentist inference uses p-values and confidence intervals to control error rates in the limit of infinite perfect replications. Bayesian inference uses credible intervals and Bayes factors to estimate credible parameter values and model evidence given the available data and prior knowledge.

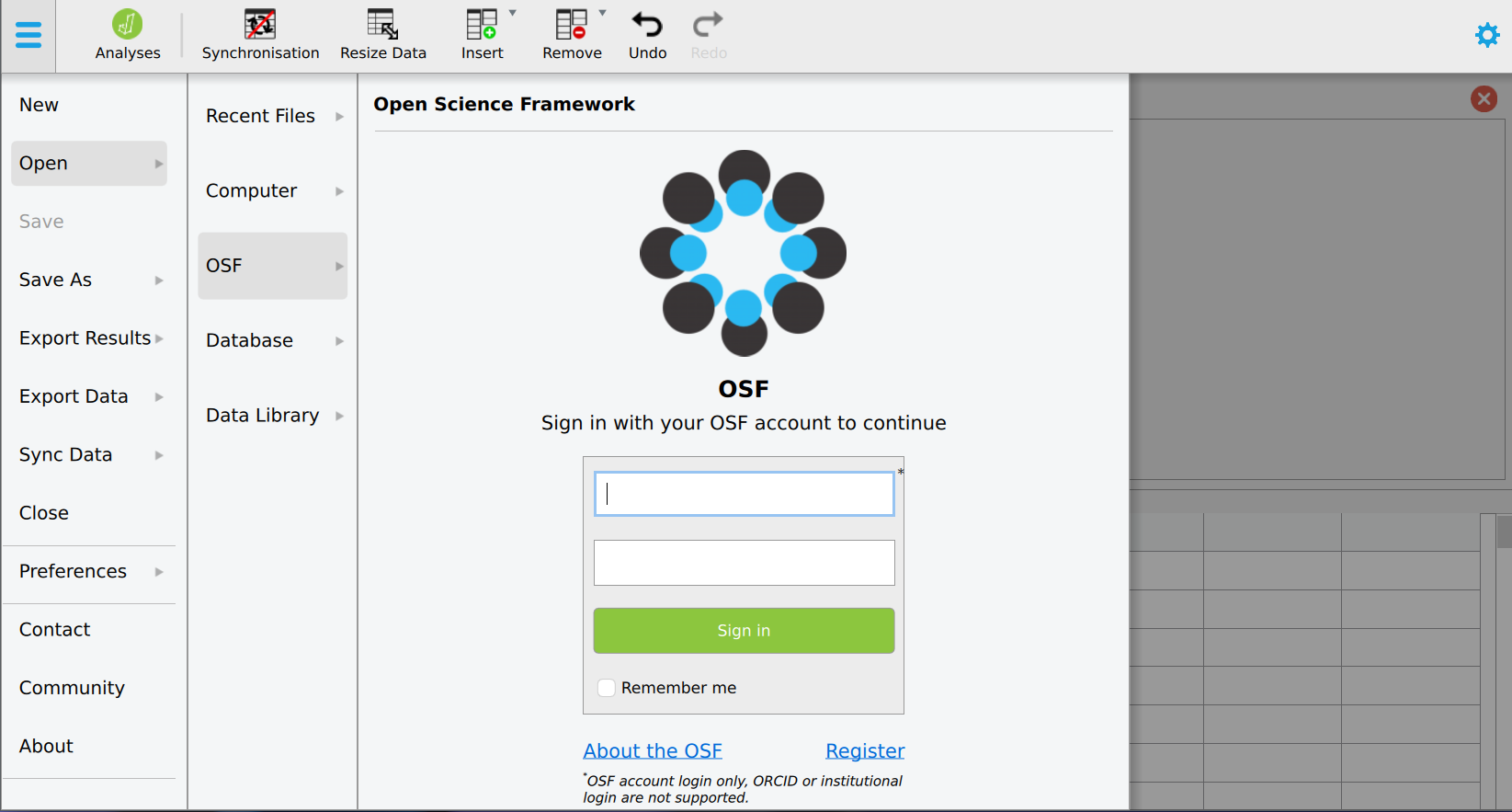
JASP open OSF dialogue

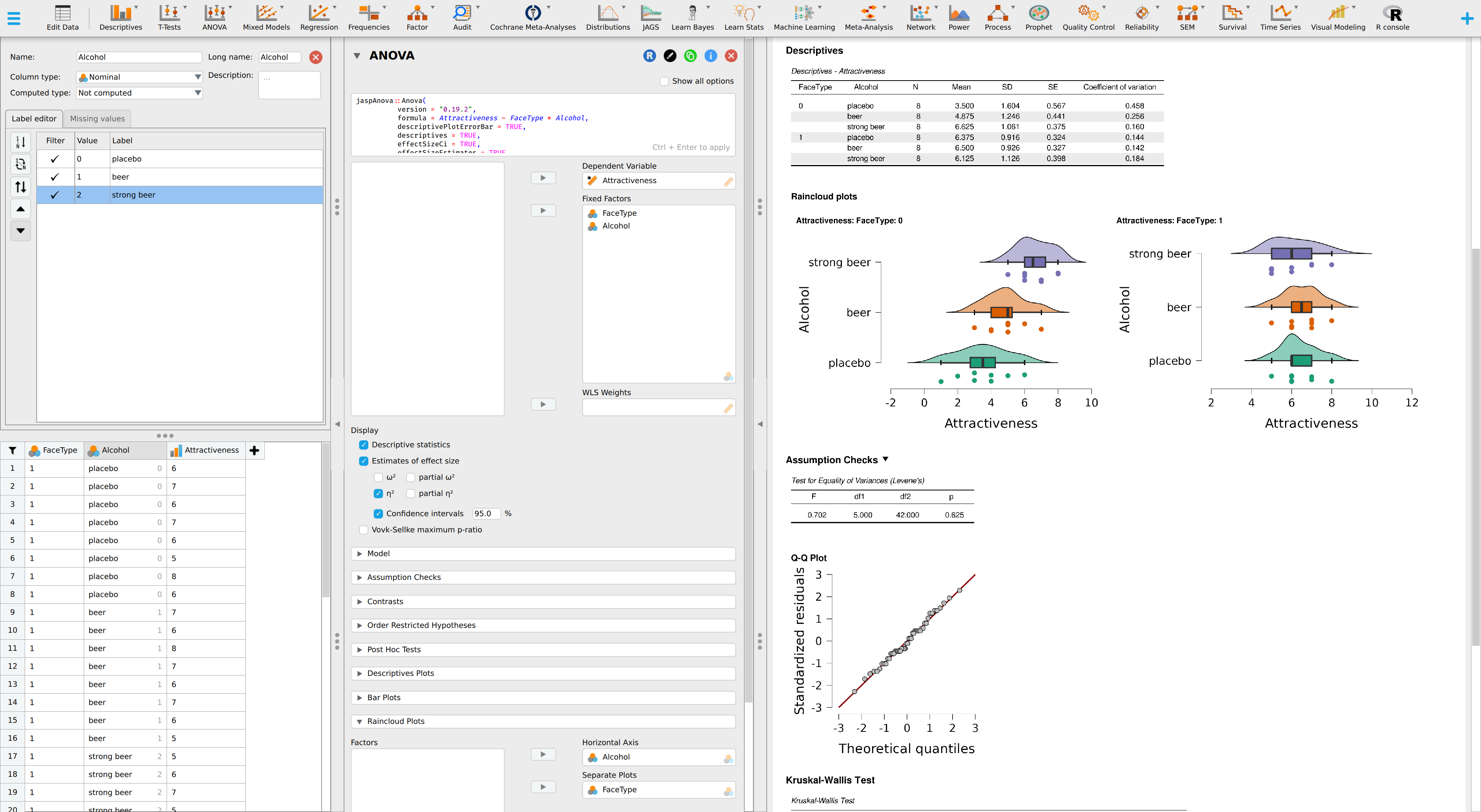
JASP ANOVA screenshot

The following analyses are available in JASP in comparison to SPSS:

GUI Features (features available via R or SPSS Syntax not listed)
	JASP 0.95.x	SPSS 31	JASP 0.95.x	SPSS 31
Analysis	Classic	Classic	Bayesian	Bayesian
Acceptance Sampling: Attribute and Variable Sample Plans	✓	X		
ANCOVA, repeated ANOVA, MANOVA and non-parametrics	✓	✓	(✓)	(✓)
Audit: tools for the auditing of organisations e.g. Benfords Law	✓	X	✓	X
BFpack, BFF (Bayesian Factor Functions), Bain (Bayesian informative hypotheses evaluation),			✓	X
BSTS - Bayesian structural time series			✓	X
Circular / Directional Statistics - analysis of directions, often angles	✓	X	X	X
Cochrane Meta-Analyses including database query from within JASP	✓	X	✓	X
Descriptives including multiple modules for plot building (Rainclouds, Time-Series, Flexplot, dedicated PlotBuilder)	✓	(✓)		
Distributions: >40 discrete and continuous ones	✓	X	✓	X
Equivalence T-Tests (TOST): Independent, Paired, One-Sample	✓	X	✓	X
Factor Analysis (PCA, EFA, CFA) including score export to data functionality	✓	✓ / AMOS	X	X
Frequencies (Binomial, Multinomial, Contingency, Chi², log-linear regression)	✓	✓	✓	(✓)
JAGS (Bayesian black-box Markov chain Monte Carlo (MCMC) sampler)			✓	(AMOS)
LearnStats (classic, bayes, simulation, annotated data examples), esci (Estimation Statistics w. Confidence Intervals)	✓	X	✓	X
Machine Learning: Regression, Classification, Cluster, Prediction / Time Series	✓	✓	X	X
Meta-Analysis for Multilevel/Multivariate/SEM (incl. SEM-Based Meta-Analysis, Effect Size Computation, Funnel Plot, PET-PEESE, WAAP-WLS, Prediction- & Selection Models, and much more from R metafor)	✓	(✓)	✓	X
(Generalized or Linear) Mixed Models	✓	✓	✓	X
Network	✓	✓	✓	X
Power Analysis / Sample Size Planning	(✓)	(✓)	X	X
PROCESS (Hayes models for mediation, moderation etc.)	✓	✓	✓	X
Time Series Analysis: Descriptives, Stationarity, ARIMA, Spectral Analysis, Prophet, Predictive Analytics	X	✓	✓	X
Quality Control (Measurement System Analysis, Control Charts, Capability Analysis, Design of Experiments)	✓	(✓)	X	X
Regression / Correlation: r, Rho, Tau, linear, logistic, generalized linear (incl. Bernoulli, Binomial, (Inverse) Gaussian, Gamma, Poisson, Multinomial/Ordinal / Firth logistic), export residual functionality	✓	✓	(✓)	(✓)
Reliability (Unidemensional, Intraclass Correlation, Rater Agreement, Bland-Altman Plots, SE of Measurement)	✓	✓	(✓)	X
Structural Equation Modeling inkl. (PLS) Partial Least Squares, Latent Growth & MIMIC	✓	AMOS	X	X
Summary Statistics	X	X	✓	X
Survival Analyses ( non-parametric, semi-parametric, parametric)	✓	✓	X	X
T-Tests: Independent, Paired, One-Sample (incl. z, Welch, non-parametrics & robust bayesian)	✓	✓	✓	(✓)
Visual Modeling: Automated Plotting, (Non-)Linear, Mixed, Generalized Linear	✓	✓	X	X

=== Other features ===
- Accessibility features (full and partial app zooming, key-board shortcut support / ALT-Navigation, VPAT)
- integrated help files and annotated data library examples for many analyses.
- R syntax editing and highlighting.
- Extensive plot and formula (LaTeX) editing capabilities.
- Exports results as PDF or HTML; tables can also be copy pasted in LaTeX format.; plots as PNG, PPTX (Powerpoint) etc.; data can be exported as CSV.
- Imports R, Excel, SAS and SPSS files etc. (.Rdata, .rds, .xls, xlsx, .csv, .txt, .tsv, .ods, .dta, .sav, .zsav, .por, .sas7bdat, .sas7bcat, .xpt, .jasp).
- Connects and syncs to SQL data bases, the Cochrane data base and the Open Science Framework.
- Data filtering: Use either R code or a drag-and-drop GUI to select cases of interest.
- Recode data with only one click.
- Full data editing with one-click recoding; full undo / redo functionality.
- Compute columns with R code (e.g. row-wise functions like rowMean, rowMeanNaRm, rowSum, rowSD ...) or a drag-and-drop GUI to create new variables or compute them from existing ones or with simulated data.
- Empty values settings per variable, per data set or globally.
- Assumption checks via export and then plotting of residuals and/or per analyses via tests and plots (Levene's, Brown-Forsythe, Shapiro–Wilk, Q–Q, Raincloud, Mardia's test and many more).

== Modules ==
JASP features seven common modules that are enabled by default:

1. Descriptives: Explore the data with tables and plots.
2. T-Tests: Evaluate the difference between two means.
3. ANOVA: Evaluate the difference between multiple means.
4. Mixed Models: Evaluate the difference between multiple means with random effects.
5. Regression: Evaluate the association between variables.
6. Frequencies: Analyses for count data.
7. Factor: Explore hidden structure in the data.

JASP also features multiple additional modules that can be activated via the module menu:

1. Acceptance Sampling: Methods for acceptance sampling and a quality control setting.
2. Audit: Statistical methods for auditing. The audit module offers planning, selection and evaluation of statistical audit samples, methods for data auditing (e.g., Benford’s law) and algorithm auditing (e.g., model fairness).
3. Bain: Bayesian informative hypotheses evaluation for t-tests, ANOVA, ANCOVA, linear regression and structural equation modeling.
4. Bayes Factor Functions (for Z-Tests, T-Tests, Regression, Frequencies)
5. BFpack (for T-Tests, ANOVA, Regression, Variances)
6. BSTS: Bayesian take on linear Gaussian state space models suitable for time series analysis.
7. Circular Statistics: Basic methods for directional data.
8. Cochrane Meta-Analyses: Analyse Cochrane medical datasets.
9. Distributions: Visualise probability distributions and fit them to data.
10. Equivalence T-Tests: Test the difference between two means with an interval-null hypothesis.
11. JAGS: Implement Bayesian models with the JAGS program for Markov chain Monte Carlo.
12. Learn Bayes: Learn Bayesian statistics with simple examples and supporting text (with Binary Classification, Counts, The Problem of Points, Buffon’s Needle)
13. Learn Stats: Learn classical statistics with simple examples and supporting text (with Normal Distribution, Binomial Distribution, Central Limit Theorem, Standard Error, Descriptive Statistics, Sample Variability, P Values, Confidence Intervals, Effect Sizes, Statistical Test Decision Tree).
14. Machine Learning: Explore the relation between variables using data-driven methods for supervised learning and unsupervised learning. The module contains 19 analyses for regression, classification and clustering:
  - Regression
    1. Boosting Regression
    2. Decision Tree Regression
    3. K-Nearest Neighbors Regression
    4. Neural Network Regression
    5. Random Forest Regression
    6. Regularized Linear Regression
    7. Support Vector Machine Regression
  - Classification
    1. Boosting Classification
    2. Decision Tree Classification
    3. K-Nearest Neighbors Classification
    4. Neural Network Classification
    5. Linear Discriminant Classification
    6. Random Forest Classification
    7. Support Vector Machine Classification
  - Clustering
    1. Density-Based Clustering
    2. Fuzzy C-Means Clustering
    3. Hierarchical Clustering
    4. Model-based clustering
    5. Neighborhood-based Clustering (i.e., K-Means Clustering, K-Medians clustering, K-Medoids clustering)
    6. Random Forest Clustering
  - Prediction
15. Meta Analysis: Synthesise evidence across multiple studies. Includes techniques for fixed and random effects analysis, fixed and mixed effects meta-regression, forest and funnel plots, tests for funnel plot asymmetry, trim-and-fill and fail-safe N analysis.
16. Network: Explore the connections between variables organised as a network. Network Analysis allows the user to analyze the network structure.
17. Power: Conduct power analyses and sample size planning.
18. Predictive Analytics: This module offers predictive analytics.
19. Process: Implementation of Hayes' popular SPSS PROCESS module for JASP
20. Prophet: A simple model for time series prediction.
21. Quality Control: Investigate if a manufactured product adheres to a defined set of quality criteria (with Measurement Systems Analysis, Control Charts, Capibility Study, Design of Experiments).
22. Reliability: Quantify the reliability of test scores.
23. Robust T-Tests: Robustly evaluate the difference between two means.
24. SEM (Structural equation modeling): Evaluate latent data structures with Yves Rosseel's lavaan program (with Structural Equation Modeling, Partial Least Squares SEM, Mediation Analysis, MMIC Model, Latent Growth).
25. Summary statistics: Apply common Bayesian tests from frequentist summary statistics for t-test, regression, and binomial tests.
26. Survival Analyses: non-parametric, semi-parametric, parametric
27. Time Series: Time series analysis with Descriptives, Stationarity, ARIMA, Spectral Analysis.
28. Visual Modeling: Graphically explore the dependencies between variables.
29. R Console: Execute R code in a console.

== Evaluating Accuracy ==
One paper compared the results of frequencies, means, correlations and regression from a number of free to use menu driven statistical packages, including JASP, and found all of the packages produced about the same results.

== See also ==
- Comparison of statistical packages
- Statistics
- Bayesian statistics
