= Pyramid Analytics =

Dutch business intelligence software company

- Type: Privately held company
- Industry: Business intelligence software
- Founded: 2009
- Founders: Omri Kohl, Avi Perez, Herbert Ochtman
- Headquarters: Amsterdam, Netherlands
- Products: Pyramid
- Number of employees: 180 (November 2022)
- Website: Pyramidanalytics.com

Pyramid Analytics is a business intelligence software company that was founded in 2009 by Omri Kohl, Avi Perez, and Herbert Ochtman. The company has offices in Amsterdam, Tel Aviv, London, Boise, and Seattle.

In early 2013, Pyramid Analytics secured its Series A of funding led by Sequoia Capital.

Pyramid Analytics released Version 5 of BI Office. In September 2014, Microsoft and Pyramid Analytics partnered with Hospital Physical Partners (HPP) to leverage their BI to "drive revenue and stay competitive."

On October 20, 2015 Pyramid Analytics secured $30 million for their round B of funding led by Viola Private Equity.

In 2016, Pyramid Analytics released BI Office Version 6.

In October 2017, Pyramid Analytics released Pyramid 2018, the next generation of its BI platform. Pyramid 2018 can run on any HTML5-compliant browser. It includes a new graphically based end-user ETL and supports multiple AI engines and languages (R, Python, TensorFlow, Weka, MLIB, SAS runtime and others).

In September 2019, Pyramid Analytics released Pyramid v2020, with several new data connectors and a powerful new augmented analytics server.

In March 2020, Pyramid Analytics secured $25 Million for their growth equity funding round led by Jerusalem Venture Partners (JVP). Participation in this round also included existing investors Sequoia Capital, Viola Growth, and Maor Investments.

In May 2022, it was announced that Pyramid Analytics had secured $120 million in Series E financing, co-led by General Oriental Investments, H.I.G. Growth Partners, and Clal Insurance Enterprises Holdings. The investment came at a "nearly" $1 billion valuation.

In February 2026, Pyramid Analytics was acquired by ServiceNow.

== Product ==
Pyramid develops and sells a data analytics platform using the marketing term "decision intelligence", meaning it is a platform that enables non-technical people to analyze data and make faster, more intelligence decisions.

Pyramid’s decision intelligence platform consists of data preparation, data science and business analytics modules with AI capabilities.

Pyramid’s PYRANA query engine launched in 2018 as a new query engine that runs directly on data lakes, OLAP and relational, and other types of data sources to boost query performance for different analytics initiatives.
