= KnetMiner =

Biological knowledge graph search platform

Content
- Description: Knowledge Network Miner
- Data types captured: Knowledge Discovery and Visualisation

Contact
- Research center: Rothamsted Research
- Laboratory: Bioinformatics
- Primary citation: doi:10.1111/pbi.13583
- Release date: October 2013

Access
- Website: knetminer.org

Tools
- Web: KnetMiner Gene View KnetMiner Evidence View KnetMiner Network View Ondex-knet-builder data integration platform

Miscellaneous
- License: MIT
- Versioning: Yes
- Data release frequency: Quarterly
- Version: 4.0 (June 2020)
- Curation policy: Manual Curation

Knowledge Network Miner(KnetMiner) is a system of tools used to integrate, search, and visualize biological knowledge graphs (KGs). It is used to search for information across large biological databases and literature to find links between genes, traits, diseases, and other relevant information.

== Current KnetMiners (non-exhaustive) ==
KnetMiner KGs are built using the data integration platform, KnetBuilder, with output available in OXL, Neo4j, and RDF graph formats. It follows FAIR data principles and supports a variety of biological data formats. The KnetMiner API provides web endpoints that enable users to search for specific genes and keywords, returning results in the form of a knowledge graph.

Originally developed through a collaboration of researchers at Rothamsted Research, KnetMiner has undergone further development and has initiated a spin-out process.

KnetMiner hosts a range of different species, including a knowledge graph dedicated to SARS-CoV-2 in response to the 2020 global pandemic, on Rothamsted Research HPC machines.

Species included in KnetMiner's knowledge graphs:

- Triticum aestivum
- Arabidopsis thaliana
- Oryza sativa japonica
- SARS-CoV-2
- Fusarium graminearum
- Fusarium culmorum
- Zymoseptoria tritici

KnetMiner has been involved in several studies, including studies for wheat, willow, and SARS-CoV-2. It is also being used for exploring pathogen-host interactions in collaboration with PHI-base, soybean loopers, and other species.

== API access ==
KnetMiner uses REST API access to obtain either JSON outputs of each view type or network views for certain searches.

== Funding ==
KnetMiner is funded by the Biotechnology and Biological Sciences Research Council, a UK research council.
