= O-Matrix =

O-Matrix is a matrix programming language for mathematics, engineering, science, and financial analysis, marketed by Harmonic Software. The language is designed for use in high-performance computing.

O-Matrix provides an integrated development environment and a matrix-based scripting language. The environment includes mathematical, statistical, engineering and visualization functions. The set of analysis functions is designed for development of complex, computationally intensive scientific, mathematical and engineering applications.

The integrated environment provides a mode that is largely compatible with version 4 of the MATLAB language in the commercial product from MathWorks. Certain features of MATLAB, such as non-numeric data types (structures, cell arrays and objects), error handling with try/catch, and nested and anonymous functions, are missing in O-Matrix.

The O-Matrix environment includes a virtual machine of the O-Matrix language to enable re-distribution of applications.

== Reception ==
Reviewing O-Matrix 5.8 for R&D Magazine, a reviewer described it as an "easy-to-use matrix-based scripting language and an intuitive integrated computing environment" containing hundreds of built-in subroutines for mathematical, engineering, and graphics functions, and noted that files from platforms such as Excel and MATLAB could be readily imported. The review concluded that the software fills a niche for users who are not served by menu-driven scientific programs, but who do not want to write custom code from scratch, and found that MATLAB users in particular could become productive with the software in a matter of hours.

A comparison of mathematical software noted that O-Matrix's lower price relative to MATLAB, once several toolboxes are added to the latter, makes it "an attractive alternative to consider", given that O-Matrix's MATLAB-compatibility mode allows it to run many existing MATLAB M-files.

== Applications ==
According to its developer, O-Matrix has been used by customers in fields including earth sciences, petroleum engineering, signal processing, and financial analysis.

== Interoperability ==
A MathLink interface was developed to enable data and programs to be transferred between O-Matrix and Mathematica.
