= XLfit =

Microsoft Excel add-in

- Developer: IDBS
- Stable release: 5.5.0.5 / 2017
- Operating system: Windows
- Type: Curve fitting, Data Analysis
- License: Proprietary software
- Website: XLfit Product Page

XLfit is a Microsoft Excel add-in that can perform regression analysis, curve fitting, and statistical analysis. It is approved by the UK National Physical Laboratory and the US National Institute of Standards and Technology XLfit can generate 2D and 3D graphs and analyze data sets. XLfit can also analyse the statistical data. It includes over seventy linear and non-linear curve fitting models. Predefined categories include:

- Exponential/Log, Power Series, Sigmoidal, Hyperbolic, Yield Density, Linear, Polynomial, Dose Response, Pharmacology, Equilibrium and Inhibition.
- Levenberg-Marquardt fitting algorithm.

A range of statistical calculations can also be applied to the data from within the spreadsheet. Example statistics include:

- F-test and t-test
- Area under the curve / ROC
- Confidence intervals
- Error values relating to parameter values or any point on the curve.

Available statistical models include Spearman's rank correlations, Student's t-test, Mann–Whitney U test, least squares, and ANOVA, among others. A model editor also allows users to add their own models and statistics to the ones provided.

== Usage ==
XLfit was validated by The UK National Physical Laboratory in 2004; the unit tests for this are provided in the model editor from version 5.4 onwards to allow each version to be easily validated.

XLfit was used by NASA to analyze the battery life of the Curiosity Mars Lander.

== Licenses ==
XLift is a proprietary software. It offers the following licensing options.

- XLfit 5 Commercial License
- XLfit 5 Academic License
- E-learning

== Version history ==
- 2002.8 XLfit 2.0.11
- 2002.5 XLfit 3.0.2
- 2003.11 XLfit 4.0.1
- 2005.6 XLfit 4.1.1
- 2005.6 XLfit 4.2.0
- 2008.7 XLfit 4.3.2
- 2009.4 XLfit 5.1.0
- 2009.7 XLfit 5.1.1
- 2009.11 XLfit 5.2.0
- 2010.11 XLfit 5.2.2
- 2011.11 XLfit 5.3.0
- 2012.1 XLfit 5.3.1
- 2014.5 XLfit 5.4.0
- 2015.5 XLfit 5.5.0

== See also ==
- List of numerical analysis software
- List of statistical packages
- Comparison of statistical packages
