= Ploticus =

Computer program for producing charts

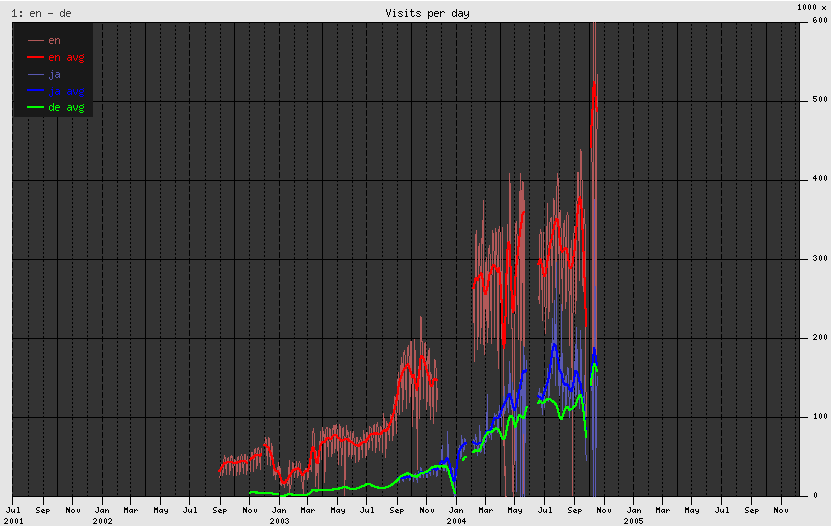
- A plot of Wikipedia statistics in Ploticus
- Original author: Steve Grubb
- Release: August 25, 1999; 26 years ago
- Stable release: 2.42 / May 2013; 13 years ago
- Written in: C
- Operating system: Cross-platform
- Type: Data analysis, statistical package, Plotting
- License: GPL
- Website: ploticus.sourceforge.net

Ploticus is a free, open-source (GPL) computer program for producing plots and charts from data. It runs under Unix, Solaris, Mac OS X, Linux and Win32 systems. Community support is customarily done through Yahoo News Groups.

== History ==
The first version was released August 25, 1999. Ploticus is a mature product with activity, where the last major release (2.42) occurred in May 2013. Bruce Byfield in Linux.com described Ploticus as, "...a throwback to the days when Unix programs did one thing, and did it well, using a minimum of system resources."

On December 17, 2016 or 2017, the author announced halting development and support of ploticus. A previous bug fix was released as a patch without a new version being released. Finally on March 16, 2023, the author announced their focus shifted to DataDraw, a new project implemented in Python exposing an API to generate SVG graphs.

== Graph types and features ==
At the center of Ploticus lies a scripting language. Through the scripting language, "2-D graphs and... basic statistical functions" are supported. Sophisticated graphs can be developed quickly using scripts previously developed, called "prefabs". Simple graphs can be produced using few parameters in addition to the data. Users can create and modify "prefabs".

Ploticus supports the following types of plot: line plots, filled line plots, category line plots, ranges sweeps, pie graphs, vertical bar graphs, horizontal bar charts, timelines, floating bar segments, bar proportions, scatter plots, heat maps (density grids), single variable distribution, error bars, curve fitting, vector plots, Venn diagrams, Venn magnitude charts, tree diagrams. Features include: scaling and axes, legends, annotations, clickmap, and mouse-over support.

== Applications ==
Ploticus has been used for:

- Animal Phenome Graphing
- Climate Trending
- Health Data Analysis

=== As a plug-in ===
Ploticus can be used as a plug-in with various other software such as:

- Semantic MediaWiki
- Asterisk PBX GUI Client

== See also ==
- List of information graphics software
