= IRows =

iRows
- Developer: Google
- Release: 31 December 2006; 19 years ago
- Type: Spreadsheet
- License: Proprietary

iRows was a web-based spreadsheet in beta with a GUI similar to the traditional desktop-based spreadsheet applications, such as Microsoft Excel and OpenOffice.org. It was shut down on December 31, 2006, after it was announced that its two founders had been hired by Google.

iRows used Ajax and XML. It was described as an example of a Web 2.0 system.

iRows supported conventional spreadsheet features functions, value formatting and charts and added web oriented spreadsheet capabilities like collaboration (multiple people using a shared spreadsheet, sending a spreadsheet as a link instead of an attachment and ability to publish spreadsheets on other web pages (e.g. blogs).

== See also ==
- List of acquisitions by Google
- List of online spreadsheets
