= PolyAnalyst =

Artificial intelligence and text mining software

- Developer: Megaputer Intelligence
- Release: 1994; 32 years ago
- Stable release: 6.5
- Type: Data science, artificial intelligence, text mining, predictive analytics
- Website: www.megaputer.com

PolyAnalyst is a data science software platform developed by Megaputer Intelligence that provides an environment for text mining, data mining, machine learning, and predictive analytics. It is used by Megaputer to build tools with applications to health care, business management, insurance, and other industries. PolyAnalyst has also been used for COVID-19 forecasting and scientific research.

== Overview ==
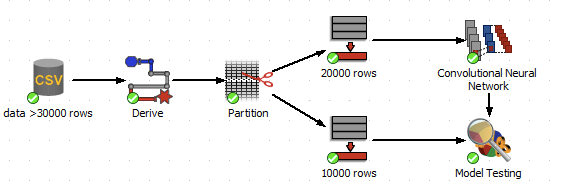
A screenshot of a PolyAnalyst flowchart showing the use of a convolutional neural network node.

PolyAnalyst's graphical user interface contains nodes that can be linked into a flowchart to perform an analysis. The software provides nodes for data import, data preparation, data visualization, data analysis, and data export. PolyAnalyst includes features for text clustering, sentiment analysis, extraction of facts, keywords, and entities, and the creation of taxonomies and ontologies. Polyanalyst supports a variety of machine learning algorithms, as well as nodes for the analysis of structured data and the ability to execute code in Python and R. PolyAnalyst also acts as a report generator, which allows the result of an analysis to be made viewable by non-analysts. It uses a client–server model and is licensed under a software as a service model.

== Business Applications ==
=== Insurance ===
PolyAnalyst was used to build a subrogation prediction tool which determines the likelihood that a claim is subrogatable, and if so, the amount that is expected to be recovered. The tool works by categorizing insurance claims based on whether or not they meet the criteria that are needed for successful subrogation. PolyAnalyst is also used to detect insurance fraud.

=== Health care ===
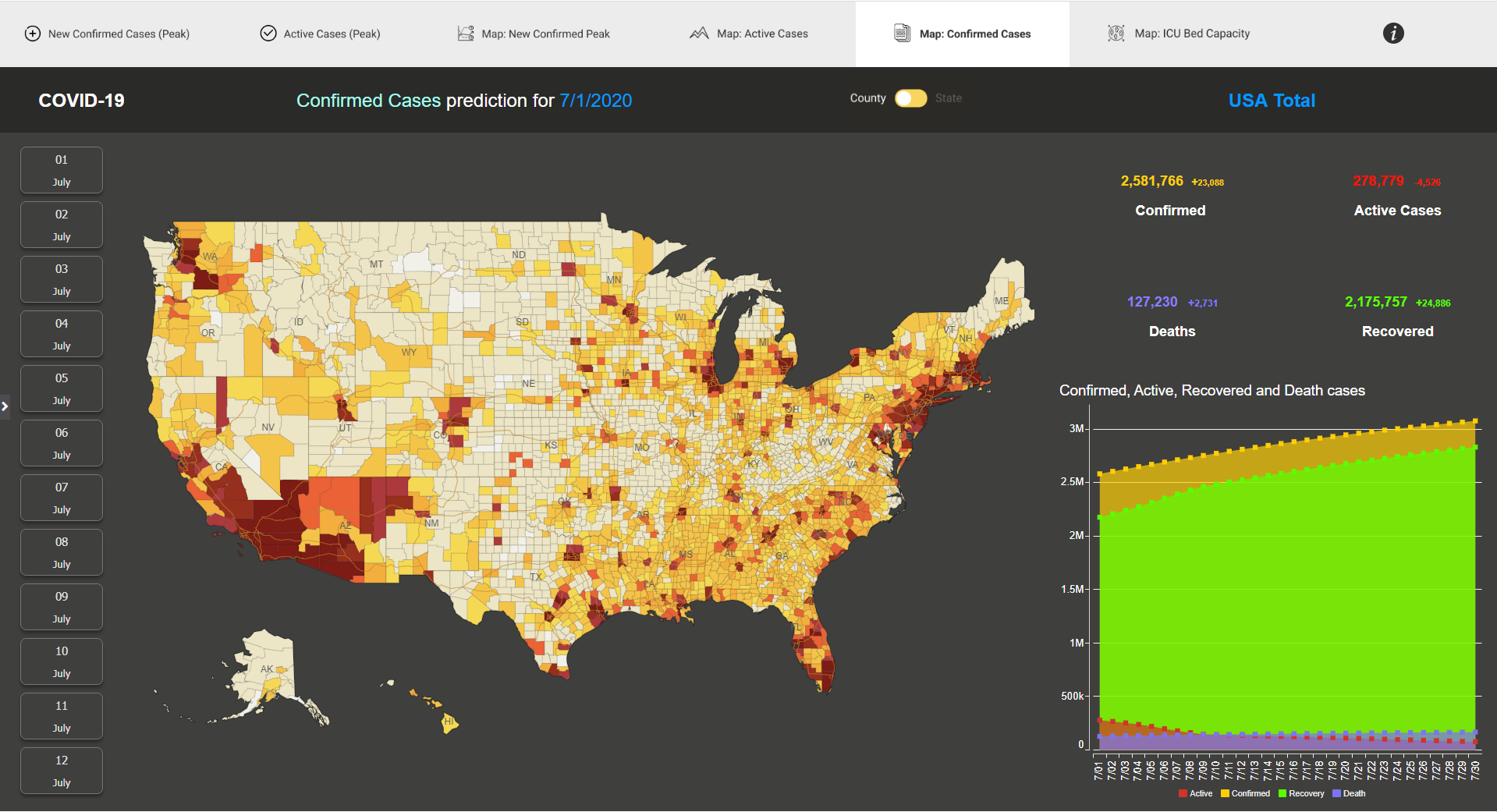
A heat map showing Megaputer's COVID-19 forecast

PolyAnalyst is used by pharmaceutical companies to assist in pharmacovigilance. The software was used to design a tool that matches descriptions of adverse events to their proper MedDRA codes, determines if side effects are serious or non-serious, and to set up cases for ongoing monitoring if needed. PolyAnalyst has also been applied to discover new uses for existing drugs by text mining ClinicalTrials.gov, and to forecast the spread of the COVID-19 virus in the United States and Russia.

=== Business management ===
PolyAnalyst is used in business management to analyze written customer feedback including product review data, warranty claims, and customer comments. In one case, PolyAnalyst was used to build a tool which helped a company monitor its employees' conversations with customers by rating their messages for factors such as professionalism, empathy, and correctness of response. The company reported to Forrester Research that this tool had saved them $11.8 million annually.

== SKIF Cyberia Supercomputer ==
PolyAnalyst is run on the SKIF Cyberia Supercomputer at Tomsk State University, where it is made available to Russian researchers through the Center for Collective Use (CCU). Researchers at the center use PolyAnalyst to perform scientific research and to management the operations of their universities. In 2020, researchers at Vyatka State University (in collaboration with the CCU) performed a study in which PolyAnalyst was used to identify and reach out to victims of domestic violence through social media analysis. The researchers scraped the web for messages containing descriptions of abuse, and then classified the type of abuse as physical, psychological, economic, or sexual. They also constructed a chatbot to contact the identified victims of abuse and to refer them to specialists based on the type of abuse described in their messages. The data collected in this study was used to create the first ever Russian-language corpus on domestic violence.
