= MEX file =

A MEX file is a type of computer file that provides an interface between MATLAB or Octave and functions written in C, C++ or Fortran. It stands for "MATLAB executable".

When compiled, MEX files are dynamically loaded and allow external functions to be invoked from within MATLAB or Octave as if they were built-in functions.

To support the development of MEX files, both MATLAB and Octave offer external interface functions that facilitate the transfer of data between MEX files and the workspace. In addition to MEX files, Octave has its format using its native API, with better performance.
