= RapidMiner =

Data science software

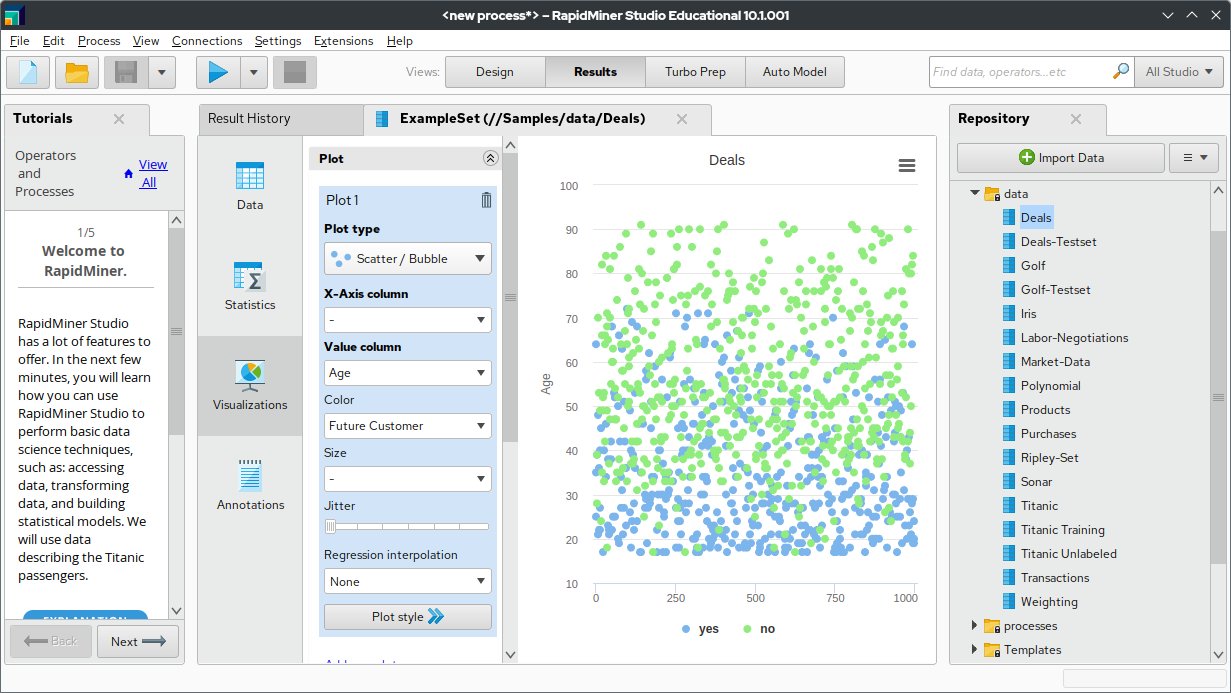
- Developer: RapidMiner
- Initial release: 2006; 20 years ago
- Stable release: 10.1 / 31 January 2023; 2 years ago
- Operating system: Cross-platform
- Type: Data science, machine learning, predictive analytics
- License: Professional and Enterprise Editions are Proprietary; Free Edition (10,000 rows and 1 logical processor limit) is available as AGPL
- Website: rapidminer.com

RapidMiner is a data science platform that analyses the collective impact of an organization's data. It was acquired by Altair Engineering in September 2022, which was acquired by Siemens for about $10 billion in March 2025.

== History ==
RapidMiner, formerly known as YALE (Yet Another Learning Environment), was developed by Ralf Klinkenberg, Ingo Mierswa, and Simon Fischer in 2001 at the Artificial Intelligence Unit of the Technical University of Dortmund. Starting in 2006, its development was driven by Rapid-I, a company founded by Ingo Mierswa and Ralf Klinkenberg in the same year. In 2013, the company rebranded from Rapid-I to RapidMiner.

== Description ==
RapidMiner uses a client/server model with the server offered either on-premises or in public or private cloud infrastructures.

RapidMiner provides data mining and machine learning procedures including: data loading and transformation (ETL), data preprocessing and visualization, predictive analytics and statistical modeling, evaluation, and deployment. RapidMiner is written in the Java programming language. RapidMiner provides a GUI to design and execute analytical workflows. Those workflows are called “Processes” in RapidMiner and they consist of multiple “Operators”. Each operator performs a single task within the process, and the output of each operator forms the input of the next one. Alternatively, the engine can be called from other programs or used as an API. Individual functions can be called from the command line. RapidMiner provides a variety of learning schemes, models, and algorithms that can be extended using R and Python scripts.

RapidMiner can also use plugins available through the RapidMiner Marketplace. The RapidMiner Marketplace is a platform for developers to create data analysis algorithms and publish them to the community.

The RapidMiner Studio Free Edition, which is limited to one logical processor and 10,000 data rows, is available under the AGPL license.

== Adoption ==
The report noted that RapidMiner provides deep and broad modeling capabilities for automated end-to-end model development. In the 2018 annual software poll, KD-nuggets readers voted RapidMiner as one of the most popular data analytics software with the poll’s respondents citing the software package as the tool they use. RapidMiner has received millions of total downloads and has over 400,000 users including BMW, Intel, Cisco, GE, and Samsung as paying customers. RapidMiner claims to be the market leader in the software for data science platforms against competitors such as SAS and IBM.

== Development ==
About 50 developers worldwide participated in the development of the open-source RapidMiner with the majority of the contributors being employees of RapidMiner. The company that develops RapidMiner received a $16 million Series C funding with participation from venture capital firms Nokia Growth Partners, Ascent Venture Partners, Longworth Venture Partners, Earlybird Venture Capital and Open-Ocean. Open-Ocean partner Michael "Monty" Widenius is one of the founders of MySQL.

== Components ==
The RapidMiner data science platform consists of the following main components: RapidMiner Studio, RapidMiner AI Hub and RapidMiner Go which can be deployed as a part of the AI Hub. This video explains the links between the main elements and advises on the suitability of each component for different user groups and use cases.
