= DataScene =

- Developers: Cyberwit, Inc.
- Stable release: 3.0.7 / March 2011
- Operating system: Windows, Linux, Unix/X11
- Type: technical graphing and analysis package
- License: Shareware
- Website: www.cyber-wit.com

DataScene is a scientific graphing, animation, data analysis, and real-time data monitoring software package. It was developed with the Common Language Infrastructure technology and the GDI+ graphics library. With the two Common Language Runtime engines - the .Net and Mono frameworks - DataScene runs on all major operating systems.

With DataScene, the user can plot 39 types 2D & 3D graphs (e.g., Area graph, Bar graph, Boxplot graph, Pie graph, Line graph, Histogram graph, Surface graph, Polar graph, Water Fall graph, etc.), manipulate, print, and export graphs to various formats (e.g., Bitmap, WMF/EMF, JPEG, PNG, GIF, TIFF, PostScript, and PDF), analyze data with different mathematical methods (fitting curves, calculating statics, FFT, etc.), create chart animations for presentations (e.g. with PowerPoint), classes, and web pages, and monitor and chart real-time data.

== History ==
DataScene was first released (version 1.0) in March 2009 for the Windows platform and the .Net 2.0 framework. Since version 2.0, DataScene has been ported to the Mono framework 2.6 and all Linux and Unix/X11 operating systems.

Cyberwit offers free licensing for the Express edition of DataScene.
