= FreeMat =

Numerical computing environment

- FreeMat icon
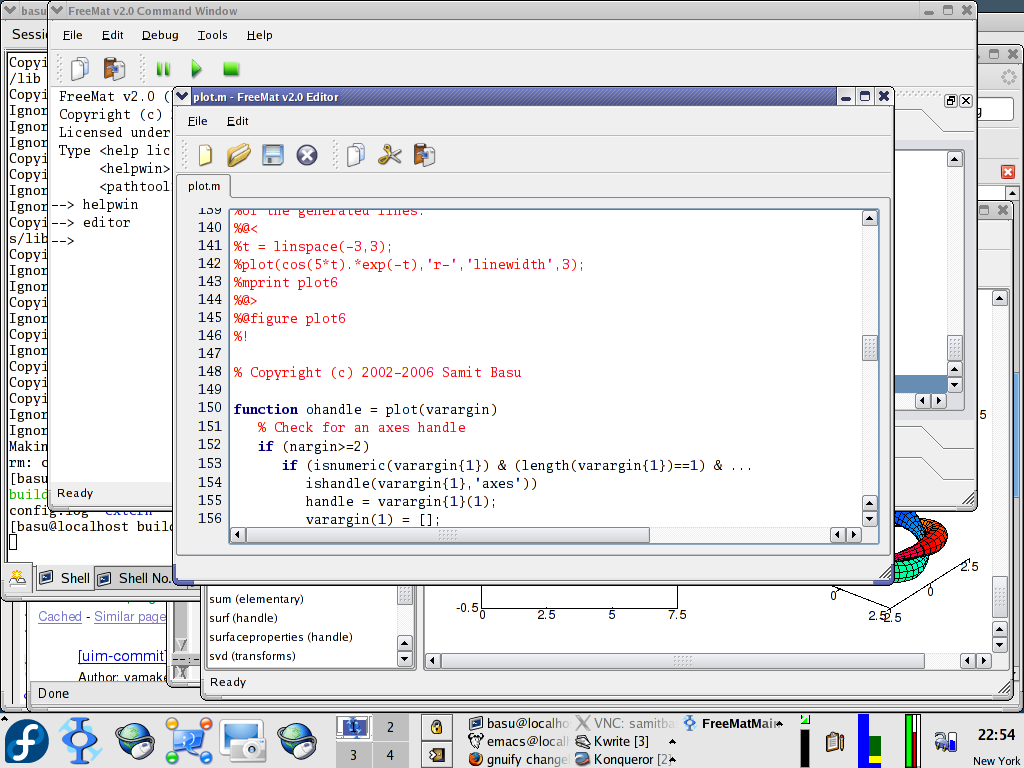
- Screenshot of FreeMat in Fedora
- Developer: Samit Basu
- Stable release: 4.2 / June 30, 2013; 12 years ago
- Written in: Assembly language, C, C++, Fortran, Qt
- Operating system: Cross-platform (Linux, macOS, Windows)
- Type: Technical computing
- License: GPL, older: MIT
- Website: freemat.sourceforge.net
- Repository: svn.code.sf.net/p/freemat/code/

FreeMat is a free open-source numerical computing environment and programming language, similar to MATLAB and GNU Octave. In addition to supporting many MATLAB functions and some IDL functionality, it features a codeless interface to external C, C++, and Fortran code, further parallel distributed algorithm development (via MPI), and has plotting and 3D visualization capabilities. Community support takes place in moderated Google Groups.
