= Qlucore =

Bioinformatics software company

- Founded: 15 January 2007
- Founder: Thoas Fioretos, Magnus Fontes, Johan Råde, Carl-Johan Ivarsson
- Headquarters: Lund, Sweden
- Products: Qlucore Omics Explorer
- Website: www.qlucore.com

Qlucore is a Swedish Bioinformatics software company founded in the year 2007. It started as a collaborative research project at Lund University, Sweden, supported by researchers at the Departments of Mathematics and Clinical Genetics. The objective was to address the vast amount of high-dimensional data generated with microarray gene expression analysis. To this end, it was imperative to have an interactive scientific software tool necessary for the conceptualize ideas emanating from the research collaborations.

Since then, a new version of the software has been released approximately every nine months. In 2017, Qlucore took a major step in the technology by adding the NGS module including a dynamic and fast Genome browser to enable analysis of data being generated with Next Generation Sequencing (NGS) technologies. Qlucore Omics Explorer is a visualisation based software program that provides for the exploration and visualization of big data. This enables researchers to analyze and explore large data sets (containing up to more than 100 million data samples) on a regular PC or Mac. Qlucore Omics Explorer customers are mainly from the Life Science, Plant, Food, and Biotech industries and from matching academic research areas.

In 2020, one more major step was taken by adding a new product line with Qlucore Diagnostics and Qlucore Insights. Qlucore Insights is for research use only, and work is ongoing (2022) to receive regulatory approval (CE) for Qlucore Diagnostics.

In the fall of 2021, Qlucore was listed on NASDAQ First North.
