= PSeven =

For designing software used in electronics and embedded systems

pSeven Desktop
- Developer: pSeven SAS
- Stable release: 2025.12 / December 15, 2025; 8 months ago
- Operating system: Cross-platform (Windows, Linux)
- Available in: English
- License: Proprietary
- Website: www.pseven.io

pSeven Desktop is a design space exploration (DSE) software platform that was developed by pSeven SAS that features design, simulation, and analysis capabilities and assists in design decisions. It provides integration with third-party CAD and CAE software tools; multi-objective and robust optimization algorithms; data analysis, and uncertainty quantification tools.

pSeven Desktop falls under the category of PIDO (Process Integration and Design Optimization) software. Design space exploration functionality is based on the mathematical algorithms of pSeven Core (formerly named MACROS) Python library.

pSeven Desktop workflow engine and algorithms from pSeven Core laid the foundation for the development of pSeven Enterprise, a cloud-native low-code platform used for engineering automation.

== History ==
In 2003, researchers from the Institute for Information Transmission Problems started collaborating with Airbus to perform R&D in the domains of simulation and data analysis using the pSeven Core library as pSeven Desktop's background. The first version of the pSeven Core library was created in association with EADS Innovation Works in 2009. Since 2012, pSeven Desktop for simulation automation, data analysis, and optimization has been developed and marketed by pSeven SAS, incorporating pSeven Core.

== Functionality ==
=== Data and model analysis ===
pSeven provides a variety of tools for data and model analysis:

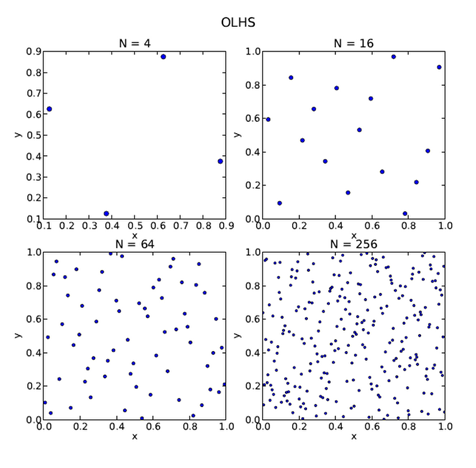
Design of experiments allows exploring design space using as small number of observations as possible, enables reliable surrogate-based optimization and generates a training sample for building an approximation model.

- The design of experiments allows controlling the process of surrogate modeling via an adaptive sampling plan.
- Sensitivity and Dependence analysis are used to filter non-informative design parameters in the study, ranking the informative ones regarding their influence on the given response function and selecting parameters that provide the best approximation.
- Uncertainty quantification capabilities in pSeven are based on OpenTURNS library.
- Dimension reduction is the process of reducing the number of random variables under consideration by obtaining a set of principal variables.
- Predictive modeling capabilities in pSeven Desktop incorporate several proprietary approximation techniques, including methods for ordered and structured data, replacing expensive computations with approximation models.

=== Optimization ===
Optimization algorithms implemented in pSeven allow solving single and multi-objective constrained optimization problems as well as robust and reliability-based design optimization problems. Users can solve both engineering optimization problems with cheap semi-analytical models and problems with expensive (in terms of CPU time) objective functions and constraints. The SmartSelection adaptively selects the optimization algorithm for a given optimization problem.

=== Process integration ===
pSeven provides tools to build and automatically run the workflow, to configure and share library of workflows and to distribute computation, including HPC. The main process integration tools of pSeven:

- CAD/CAE integration adapters (SolidWorks, CATIA, NX, PTC Creo, Ansys Workbench), CAE solvers and other engineering tools (Ansys Mechanical, Ansys CFD, FloEFD, CST Microwave Studio, ADAMS, Simulink, MATLAB, Scilab, Abaqus, Unified FEA, Nastran, LS-DYNA, Simcenter STAR-CCM+, OpenFOAM, Forge, etc.)
- High Performance Computing (HPC) capabilities (supported batch systems: SLURM, TORQUE, LSF)
- Functional Mock-up Interface (FMI) for model exchange and co-simulation

== Applications ==
pSeven Desktop's application areas are different industries such as aerospace, automotive, energy, electronics, biomedical and others.

pSeven Desktop has been used for the optimization of layered composite armor to reduce its weight and for multidisciplinary and multi-objective optimization of an aircraft family.
