= Epi Map =

Epi Info
- Developer: Centers for Disease Control and Prevention
- Stable release: 3.5.3 / January 26, 2011; 14 years ago
- Written in: Visual Basic 6.0
- Operating system: Windows
- Available in: 4 languages
- Type: Statistical software, epidemiology
- License: Public domain
- Website: www.cdc.gov/EpiInfo

Epi Map is a module that displays geographic maps with data from Epi Info. Epi Map is built around the Esri MapObjects software. Epi Map displays shapefiles containing the geographic boundaries layered with data results from the Analysis module.

Epi Map is designed to show data from Epi Info 2000 files by relating data fields to SHAPE files containing the geographic boundaries. Shapefiles also can contain data on population or other variables, and can therefore provide numeric data that become part of the display either as numerator or denominator.

== See also ==
- Geographic information system
- Geospatial analysis
- List of geographic information systems software
- Cartogram
- CrimeStat
- ArcView
- MapInfo
