= Trade Space Visualizer =

- Developer: Mike Yukish, Gary Stump, Tim Simpson, Sara Lego, John O'Hara
- First appeared: 2010
- Stable release: 4.7.1 / February 2010
- OS: Windows, Macintosh
- Website: http://www.atsv.psu.edu/

The Trade Space Visualizer is a data visualization tool developed at the Applied Research Laboratory (ARL) at The Pennsylvania State University. Initial development started in 2002, and it is currently supported by a team at ARL/Penn State.

== Overview ==
The Trade Space Visualizer is a Java-based tool that includes multidimensional visualization techniques to display data files. The interface can load data in tabular format (.txt or .csv format). Recent work has focused on using the interface to drive underlying simulation models, by allowing users to place visual steering commands within data visualization plots.

=== Visualization Capabilities ===
- 3D Glyph Plots
- 2D Scatter Plot
- Scatter Matricies
- Parallel Coordinates
- Histogram plots
- Binned Plots

=== Additional Features ===
- Visual Steering
- Brushing/Linked Views
- Preference Shading
- Pareto Frontiers
- Supports continuous, discrete, categorical, and datetime variables
- K-Means Clustering
- Principal Component Analysis
- Add Calculated Columns
