= Poimapper =

Data analysis software

Poimapper is an on-site data collection, sharing and analysis software. Poimapper is developed by Pajat Solutions Ltd., a Finnish software company founded in 2012.

The mobile application is used to collect and update data. By uploading data to a cloud server, it is shared among other mobile and office workers.

In 2013, Pajat Solutions was awarded the European CSR award for innovative, non-business partnerships that have helped to solve social problems while creating business advantage. The award came from a partnership where NGO's like Plan International were using Poimapper in their health-related monitoring and evaluation work.

Poimapper is also used in supplier audits, due to is ability to process large supplier audit checklists effectively, including score calculations, coloring of results and summarizing findings into corrective action tables. The action table can be shared to supplies for updating their action proposals, schedules and action status. The solution also supports supplier self-audits.
