= TopoFusion =

- Developer(s): Scott Morris; Alan Morris
- Initial release: 2002; 23 years ago
- Stable release: 5.51 / 5 August 2018; 6 years ago
- Operating system: Microsoft Windows
- Type: GPS Mapping
- License: Proprietary
- Website: www.topofusion.com
- As of: 27 October 2018

TopoFusion GPS Mapping software designed to plan and analyze trails using topographic maps and GPS tracks.

== History ==
The software was created in 2002 by two brothers who were outdoor bikepacking enthusiasts and felt software could help them plan better trails. They developed the first version of the software in 2002 and one included it as part of his doctorate dissertation on GPS Driven Trail Simulation and Network Production. In 2004 the developers and one other jointly presented the paper Digital Trail Libraries which illustrated some of the graph theory algorithms used by the software. As of 2018 the software remains supported with refined functionality and improved support for additional maps and GPS Devices.

== Features ==
The software was designed to plan and analyze trails. When used for planning proposed routes may be planned and checked against different maps, and the result(s) downloaded to a GPS tracking device. Topofusion is particularly noted for eased of switch and combining maps and for capability of simultaneously managing multiple trails. After a trail has been executed the resultant GPS log can be uploaded to TopoFusion and the actual route analyzed with the addition of any photographic images recorded on route.

The product is marketed as a fully featured 'professional version and a more basic version with reduced functionality at lower cost. A fully featured trial version which is not time limited is available which restricts usability by watermarking map display tiles by overlaying the word 'DEMO'. The software is available directly Microsoft Windows only, however TopoFusion has claimed users have reported success using VMWare Fusion and Parallels emulation on Mac OS.

== Applications ==
TopoFusion has been found useful by those engaged in the sport of geocaching.

The software has been used in assisting analysis of GPS routes. A survey reported in 2004 of GPS tracking of motorists visiting the Acadia National Park in Maine, United States was assisted by use of Topofusion to review the scenes visited. It has also been used in studies of agriculture transportation logistics.

TopoFusion can also assist in determining where photographs have been taken on a trail and can geocoded photo the image or tag it onto a map. For this to be successful the digital camera's time must be synchronized with the GPS unit time, and both the GPS track and digital images made available to Topofusion. The time when the image was taken can then be matched to the time on the GPS log and this enables the image to be enhanced with geocode fields when Real-time geotagging was not available when the image was taken. TopoFusion can also optionally annotate maps with images.
