= MWorks =

Computer software

MWorks is an engineering simulation and numeric computing software developed by Suzhou Tongyuan Software & Control Technology Co., Ltd. It provides an interactive programming environment supporting co-simulation of engineering models from different domains.

The software consists of the numerical computing environment MWorks.Syslab, the system modeling and simulation environment MWorks.Sysplorer, the collaborative system modeling and model data management environment MWorks.Syslink, and the computational simulation cloud platform MoHub.

MWorks supports graphical drag-and-drop development and creation of user interfaces, and offers C/C++ and Python APIs as well as interoperability with other simulation software such as Simulink.

== Features ==
=== Programming languages ===
Syslab is based on Julia, while Sysplorer is based on Modelica. In addition, Syslab can run MATLAB M-language scripts via Tongyuan M Language compatibility tool (TyMLang).

=== Toolboxes ===
MWorks provides toolboxes for signal processing, communications, image processing, control system design and analysis, artificial intelligence, and other fields.

=== Model libraries ===
MWorks offers standard libraries for mechanical, electrical, thermal, hydraulic, as well as professional libraries for hydraulics, transmission, motors, and industry-specific libraries for automotive and energy industry.

== Marketing ==
Since 2022, Tongyuan has promoted MWorks in teaching and research at universities including Harbin Institute of Technology, Beihang University, Beijing Institute of Technology, and Harbin Engineering University.

== Reception ==
=== Positive ===
MWorks.Sysplorer was named an Excellent Industrial Software Product by the Ministry of Industry and Information Technology in 2022.

=== Negative ===
Compared with MATLAB, MWorks has a certain advantage in physical modeling, but its execution speed is lower than MATLAB. Its error messages sometimes do not accurately indicate their cause, and the limited number of toolboxes may not meet certain simulation needs. It also lacks compatibility with some MATLAB functions when running M scripts.
