= Statistical Lab =

- Developer(s): Free University of Berlin
- Stable release: 3.81 / 2 May 2011
- Operating system: Windows XP, Windows 2000, Windows 7
- Type: Statistical analysis
- License: GPL for non-commercial users
- Website: www.statistiklabor.de/en

The computer program Statistical Lab (Statistiklabor) is an explorative and interactive toolbox for statistical analysis and visualization of data. It supports educational applications of statistics in business administration, economics, social sciences and humanities. The program is developed and constantly advanced by the Center for Digital Systems of the Free University of Berlin. Their website states that the source code is available to private users under the GPL. So if a commercial user wishes to obtain a copy, then they must do so indirectly, from a private user who already has a copy (any of their employees will do).

Simple or complex statistical problems can be simulated, edited and solved individually with the Statistical Lab. It can be extended by using external libraries. Via these libraries, it can also be adapted to individual and local demands like specific target groups. The versatile graphical diagrams allow demonstrative visualization of underlying data.

The Statistical Lab is the successor of Statistik interaktiv!. In contrast to the commercial SPSS the Statistical Lab is didactically driven. It is focused on providing facilities for users with little statistical experience. It combines data frames, contingency tables, random numbers, matrices in a user friendly virtual worksheet. This worksheet allows users to explore the possibilities of calculations, analysis, simulations and manipulation of data.

For mathematical calculations, the Statistical Lab uses the R package, which is a free implementation of the language S Plus (originally developed by Bell Laboratories).

== See also ==
- R interfaces
