= Qunb =

qunb
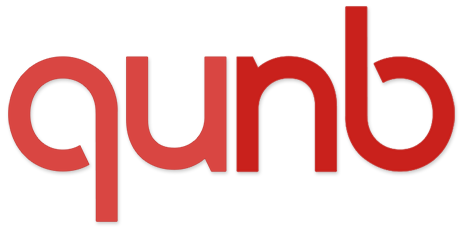
- Website type: Data Visualization Tool
- Available in: English
- Website: qunb.com
- Commercial: Yes
- Registration: free
- Launched: 2022
- Current status: Closed

qunb is a cloud-based internet service startup which provides a data visualization service. Qunb was founded in Paris, France and is incorporated in Boston, USA. In 2013, Qunb took part in the Spring TechStars Boston startup accelerator program.

== Services ==
The main product of Qunb is a B2B data visualization service on the cloud. It is used on the Qunb website but it can also be shared and embedded on external websites. The tool is used to generate charts and graphs from datasets that are uploaded on the Qunb website, which is then assembled into a slideshow. The service is only available on web browsers.

Technology: Use Case

Qunb additionally provides a standard data visualization service for Google Analytics. The Google Analytics GAPI is used to extract key performance indicators from Google Analytics dashboard metrics without the use of third-party data analysis tools. The dimensions and nodes are processed on Qunb servers.

== History ==
Qunb was founded in 2011 by serial entrepreneurs Cyrille Vincey and Jean-Baptiste Théard as a Big Data online vendor where users could buy and analyze data. The startup was part of the second batch of the French startup accelerator program Le Camping, and later became part of LeChaudron, a spinoff from the program.

In November 2012, Qunb was selected to be part of TechStars Boston Spring 2013.

In November 2014 Qunb was acquired by Ve Interactive, a technology company headquartered in London, for a "multi-million pound cash and shares deal”.

== Awards ==
- Champion, LeWeb 2012 Startup Competition
- Best French Startup, The Europas Awards 2013

Startup Accelerators:

- LeCamping 2011/2
- TechStars Boston 2013
