= SmartPLS =

Software

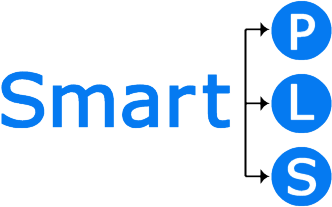
- Original authors: Christian M. Ringle, Sven Wende, Jan-Michael Becker
- Developer: SmartPLS GmbH
- Initial release: 2005
- Stable release: SmartPLS 4.1.1.2 / March 12, 2025; 15 months ago
- Operating system: Windows and Mac
- Platform: Java
- Available in: English (default language), Arabic, Bulgarian, Chinese, Czech, Danish, Dutch, Estonian, Finnish, French, German, Greek, Hungarian, Indonesian, Italian, Japanese, Korean, Lithuanian, Malay, Persian, Polish, Portuguese, Romanian, Spanish, Urdu, Norwegian, Russian, Slovak, Slovenian, Swedish, Turkish, Ukrainian, Vietnamese
- Type: Statistical analysis, multivariate analysis, regression analysis,structural equation modeling, partial least squares path modeling
- License: SmartPLS 4: Proprietary software
- Website: www.smartpls.com

SmartPLS is a software with graphical user interface for variance-based structural equation modeling (SEM) using the partial least squares (PLS) path modeling method. Users can estimate models with their data by using basic PLS-SEM, weighted PLS-SEM (WPLS), consistent PLS-SEM (PLSc-SEM), and sumscores regression algorithms. The software computes standard results assessment criteria (e.g., for the reflective and formative measurement models and the structural model, including the HTMT criterion, bootstrap based significance testing, PLSpredict, and goodness of fit) and it supports additional statistical analyses (e.g., confirmatory tetrad analysis, higher-order models, importance-performance map analysis, latent class segmentation, mediation, moderation, measurement invariance assessment, multigroup analysis, regression analysis, logistic regression, path analysis, PROCESS, confirmatory factor analysis, and covariance-based structural equation modeling). Since SmartPLS is programmed in Java, it can be executed and run on different computer operating systems such as Windows and Mac.

== SmartPLS4 ==
The Newest addition is the SmartPLS4. The software released to the general public in 2022 is an easy-to-use tool for Structural Equation Modelling. To estimate the model in SmartPLS, the model has to be estimated at two levels that include the measurement model assessment and structural model assessment.

Measurement Model assessment involves several steps that includes the assessment of quality criteria that includes the evaluation of factor loadings, construct reliability, construct validity. The criteria for factor loadings is 0.70, any items with loadings less than 0.70 may be considered for removal, if removing the items can improve the reliability and validity over the required threshold. Further Construct reliability is assessed using Cronbach Alpha and Composite Reliability, the required value for both is 0.70. Further, construct validity is assessed using convergent validity (AVE > 0.50) and Discriminant validity (Fornell & Larcker Criterion and Heterotrait-Monotrait Ratio).

Next, after measurement model assessment structural model is assessed to substantiate the proposed hypotheses. This can include direct, indirect, or moderating relationships. SmartPLS4 is an increasingly used tool for SEM that can help model simple and complex model.

== See also ==
- Estimation theory
- Partial least squares path modeling
- Partial least squares regression
- Principal component analysis
- Regression analysis
- Regression validation
- WarpPLS
