= Pyxplot =

- Developers: Dominic Ford, Ross Church
- Initial release: 2006
- Stable release: 0.9.2 / 19 September 2012; 13 years ago
- Written in: C
- Platform: Cross-platform
- Available in: English
- Type: Plotting
- License: GNU GPL
- Website: www.pyxplot.org.uk

Pyxplot is a free software command-line graph-plotting and vector graphics package. Its interface is similar to that of gnuplot, but its graphics engine is optimised to produce output in a style appropriate for inclusion in academic journals. The LaTeX typesetting system is used to render all text labels, making it easy to annotate graphs with mathematical expressions. In addition, Pyxplot has many more flow control constructs than gnuplot, making it much easier to perform batch operations.

Pyxplot is available for free download under the GNU GPL.

== Mathematical environment ==
Pyxplot's mathematical environment is unusual in that numerical variables can have physical units. Mathematical expressions involving quantities with physical units automatically calculate the dimensions of the resulting quantity; for example, squaring a distance will automatically produce an area. Data files read in in one unit (for example inches), can be output in another unit (for example meters).

All of Pyxplot's numerical analysis commands, such as curve-fitting, Fourier transforms and histogram generation also natively support quantities with physical units. Pyxplot's vector graphics drawing commands allow positions on the page and rotation angles to be specified by quantities with appropriate physical units.
