= DISLIN =

Plotting library

- Developer: Helmut Michels
- Stable release: 11.6.1 / June 2026; 0 months ago
- Operating system: Cross-platform
- Type: Plotting library
- License: Free for non-commercial and commercial use
- Website: www.dislin.de

DISLIN is a high-level plotting library developed by Helmut Michels at the Max Planck Institute for Solar System Research in Göttingen, Germany. Helmut Michels has worked as a mathematician and Unix system manager at the computer center of the institute. He retired in April 2020 and founded the company Dislin Software.

The DISLIN library contains routines and functions for displaying data as curves, bar graphs, pie charts, 3D-colour plots, surfaces, contours and maps. Several output formats are supported such as X11, VGA, PostScript, PDF, CGM, WMF, EMF, SVG, HPGL, PNG, BMP, PPM, GIF and TIFF.

DISLIN is available for the programming languages Fortran 77, Fortran 90/95 and C. Plotting extensions for the languages Perl, Python, Java, Julia, Ruby, Rust, Go and Tcl are also supported for most operating systems. There is a third-party package to use DISLIN from IDL.

== History ==
The first version 1.0 was released in December 1986. The current version of DISLIN is 11.6.1, released in June 2026

Since version 11.3 the DISLIN software is free for non-commercial and commercial use.
