= SIMUL =

Econometric software

- Developer: Rodolphe BUDA
- Initial release: 3.2
- Stable release: 3.2 / 2011
- Operating system: Windows
- Type: Multidimensional Econometric Modelling
- License: proprietary
- Website: econpapers.repec.org/software/dgeqmrbcd/187.htm

SIMUL (Note: Short for Système Intégré de Modélisation mULti-dimensionelle) is an econometric tool for the multidimensional (multi-sectoral and multi-regional) modelling. It allows to implement easily multidimensional econometric models according to their reduced form $Y_{r,b}=X_{r,b}.a_{r,b}+\varepsilon_{r,b}$ - where X and Y are two economic variables, r and b (resp.) denote the region and the branch (resp.) and where $\varepsilon$ is the residual.

It has been initially developed in the middle of the 90's inside the GAMA Team of the Professor Raymond Courbis at the University of Paris 10 during the project of multi-regional and multi-sectoral national models of REGILINK (R.Courbis, 1975, 1979, 1981).

== SIMUL 3.2 ==
Since 2003, SIMUL release 3.2 has been developed independently from the REGILINK models. It can always run them but not only.

The conception of SIMUL 3.2 was inspired by a software used during a long time in GAMA Team, the SIMSYS software, developed by M.C.McCracken and C.A.Sonnen. SIMUL 3.2 is a tool for preparing, estimating and running dynamic, multi-sectoral and multi-regional models. It has been developed in Turbo-Pascal and needs it during the working sessions. The user implement the econometric models into a "natural language" the SIMUL 3.2 translates, compiles and runs it according to a Code generation process.

SIMUL 3.2 has been applied to French labor market analysis.

SIMUL 3.2 is freely downloadable at the Econpapers website
