= Seeq Corporation =

Software company providing analytics for industrial processes

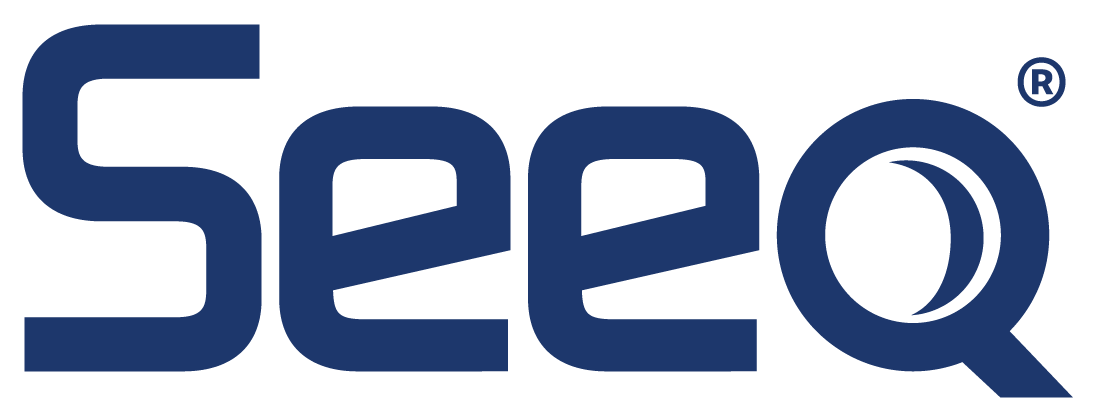
- Type: Private
- Industry: Software
- Founded: Seattle, Washington (2013)
- Founders: Steve Sliwa; Brian Parsonnet; Jon Peterson; Mark Derbecker
- Headquarters: Seattle, Washington, United States
- Key people: Pete Higgins (Chairman of the Board and founding partner); Cameron Myhrvold, (Board Director)
- Number of employees: 102 (April 2019)
- Website: seeq.com

Seeq Corporation is a software company founded in 2013 and headquartered in Seattle, Washington, United States. The company creates analytics software for various industrial process manufacturing sectors, including pharmaceuticals, oil and gas, mining, pulp and paper, energy, utilities, IIoT, and chemicals.

Seeq's browser-based software is designed for use with time series data, commonly aggregated in data historians such as Aveva's PI system, Inductive Automation's Ignition system, and others like Emerson's Ovation and DeltaV, GE Proficy, Honeywell's Uniformance PHD, Wonderware, and AspenTech IP.21.

Seeq's applications enable organizations to analyze data for improved business outcomes. Workbench, one of Seeq's applications, offers data visualization, data modeling, and interactive tools for diagnostic, monitoring, predictive, and descriptive analytics. It also provides search functionality, knowledge capture, and collaboration tools. Seeq Organizer facilitates the creation of documents, consolidating analyses and visualizations into reports, presentations, and meeting agendas. Documents generated in Organizer directly link to the underlying data and are 'time-relative', meaning they can be categorized based on parameters such as batch, shift, or day. Seeq Runtime continuously performs data cleansing, boundary management, and streaming calculations on historian data. Accessed through either Seeq Workbench or the Seeq REST API, the runtime operates autonomously and can be integrated with existing alarm systems or dashboard solutions.

Seeq can be configured with installations on a dedicated server, server cluster, or virtual machine. On-premise installations on the same network as a plant or enterprise historian, on the cloud (Microsoft Azure, Amazon Web Services, etc.), or in a mixed environment of on-premise and cloud resources are supported. Seeq also enables the creation of custom templates and modules through data export, data integration, and a REST API. Data export options include Microsoft Excel and PowerPoint, as well as OData clients (Tableau, Microsoft PowerBI, etc.). Data integration with OSIsoft Vision is supported, and the REST API offers SDKs for programming in C#, Python, MATLAB, and Java. Seeq uses a connector to retrieve data in real-time based on user actions.
