= Causality (book) =

2000 book by Judea Pearl

Causality: Models, Reasoning, and Inference
- Author: Judea Pearl
- Language: English
- Subject: Causality
- Publisher: Cambridge University Press
- Publication date: 2000, 2009
- Pages: 484
- ISBN: 978-0521895606

Causality: Models, Reasoning, and Inference (2000; updated 2009) is a book by Judea Pearl. It is an exposition and analysis of causality. It is considered to have been instrumental in laying the foundations of the modern debate on causal inference in several fields including statistics, computer science and epidemiology. In this book, Pearl espouses the Structural Causal Model (SCM) that uses structural equation modeling. This model is a competing viewpoint to the Rubin causal model. Some of the material from the book was reintroduced in the more general-audience targeting The Book of Why.

== Content ==
The books contents provides a useful summary of the key concept addressed

1. Introduction to Probabilities, Graphs, and Causal Models
2. A Theory of Inferred Causation
3. Causal Diagrams and the Identification of Causal Effects
4. Actions, Plans, and Direct Effects
5. Causality and Structural Models in Social Science and Economics
6. Simpson’s Paradox, Confounding, and Collapsibility
7. The Logic of Structure-Based Counterfactuals
8. Imperfect Experiments: Bounding Effects and Counterfactuals
9. Probability of Causation: Interpretation and Identification
10. The Actual Cause
11. Reflections, Elaborations, and Discussions with Readers

== Reviews ==
Pearl succeeds in bringing together in a general nonparametric framework the counterfactual tradition of causal analysis with the variants of structural equation modeling worth keeping. The graph theory that he uses to accomplish this fusion is often elegant. Thus, Causality is a major statement, which all who claim to know what causality is must read.

— Stephen L. Morgan (2004)

For Hoover (2003, p F412-13) the key idea introduced is what Pearl calls d-separation. This is the view that a set of causes intervening between two variables or a set of parent causes of two variables induces a relationship of conditional independence between them. Through this means Hoover argues, Pearl develop(s) powerful algorithms for inferring causal structure from non-experimental data and for calculating the effects of interventions in one part of the causal structure on other parts (the do-calculus).(2003, p F412-13). For Morgan (2004, p. 413) Pearl's do-operator is his most memorable concept. This is a physical metaphor for ideas normally discussed in the complex language of counterfactuals. And At the risk of oversimplifying, it is not unfair to say that Pearl’s definition of causality rests primarily on this distinction between Pr(Y |X) and Pr(Y | do(X)), thereby bringing the crux of his argument in line with the counterfactual model of causality ( Morgan, 2004, p. 413).

The book earnt Pearl the 2001 Lakatos Award in Philosophy of Science.

In addition to the Morgan (2004) review there have been many other substantial reviews of the book from a range of approaches; the economic, the philosophical and the political. These include:

- Neuberg, Leland Gerson. (2003) "Causality: models, reasoning, and inference, by judea pearl, cambridge university press, 2000." Econometric Theory 19.4 : 675-685.
- Gillies, Donald. (2001) "Causality: Models, reasoning, and inference Judea pearl." The British Journal for the Philosophy of Science 52, no. 3 : 613-622.
- Hoover, Kevin D. (2003) Causality: Models, Reasoning, and Inference., The Economic Journal, Volume 113, Issue 488, June 2003, Pages F411–F413, https://doi.org/10.1111/1468-0297.13919
- Hitchcock, C. (2001). [Review of Causality: Models, Reasoning and Inference, by J. Pearl]. The Philosophical Review, 110(4), 639–641. https://doi.org/10.2307/3182612
- Didelez, V., & Pigeot, I. (2001). [Review of Causality: Models, Reasoning, and Inference, by J. Pearl]. Politische Vierteljahresschrift, 42(2), 313–315. http://www.jstor.org/stable/24199253

== See also ==
- Causality
- Causal inference
- Structural equation modeling
