= Confirmatory composite analysis =

In statistics, confirmatory composite analysis (CCA) is a subtype of structural equation modeling (SEM). Although historically, CCA emerged from a reorientation and restart of partial least squares path modeling (PLS-PM), it has become an independent approach and the two should not be confused. In many ways it is similar to, but also quite distinct from, confirmatory factor analysis (CFA). It shares with CFA the process of model specification, model identification, model estimation, and model assessment. However, in contrast to CFA which always assumes the existence of latent variables, in CCA all variables can be observable, with their interrelationships expressed in terms of composites, i.e., linear compounds of subsets of the variables. The composites are treated as the fundamental objects and path diagrams can be used to illustrate their relationships. This makes CCA particularly useful for disciplines examining theoretical concepts that are designed to attain certain goals, so-called artifacts, and their interplay with theoretical concepts of behavioral sciences.

== Development ==
The initial idea of CCA was sketched by Theo K. Dijkstra and Jörg Henseler in 2014. The first full description of CCA was published by Florian Schuberth, Jörg Henseler and Theo K. Dijkstra in 2018. As is common for statistical developments, interim developments of CCA were shared with the scientific community in written form. Moreover, CCA was presented at several conferences including the 5th Modern Modeling Methods Conference, the 2nd International Symposium on Partial Least Squares Path Modeling, the 5th CIM Community Workshop, and the Meeting of the SEM Working Group in 2018. Finally, it was introduced in various disciplines.

== Statistical model ==
Example of a model containing 3 composites

A composite is typically a linear combination of observable random variables. However, also so-called second-order composites as linear combinations of latent variables and composites, respectively, are conceivable.

For a random column vector $\mathbf{x}$ of observable variables that is partitioned into sub-vectors $\mathbf{x}_i$, composites can be defined as weighted linear combinations. So the i-th composite $c_i$ equals:

$$c_i= \mathbf{w}_i'\mathbf{x}_i$$,

where the weights of each composite are appropriately normalized (see Confirmatory composite analysis#Model identification). In the following, it is assumed that the weights are scaled in such a way that each composite has a variance of one, i.e., $\mathbf{w}_i' \mathbf{\Sigma}_{ii} \mathbf{w}_i$. Moreover, it is assumed that the observable random variables are standardized having a mean of zero and a unit variance. Generally, the variance-covariance matrices $\mathbf{\Sigma}_{ii}$ of the sub-vectors are not constrained beyond being positive definite. Similar to the latent variables of a factor model, the composites explain the covariances between the sub-vectors leading to the following inter-block covariance matrix:

$$\mathbf{\Sigma}_{ij}=\rho_{ij} \mathbf{\Sigma}_{ii}\mathbf{w}_i (\mathbf{\Sigma}_{jj} \mathbf{w}_j)'$$,

where $\rho_{ij}$ is the correlation between the composites $c_j$ and $c_i$. The composite model imposes rank one constraints on the inter-block covariance matrices $\mathbf{\Sigma}_{ij}$, i.e., $\text{rank}(\mathbf{\Sigma}_{ij})=1$. Generally, the variance-covariance matrix of $\mathbf{x}$ is positive definite iff the correlation matrix of the composites $\mathbf{R}:=(\rho_{ij})$ and the variance-covariance matrices $\mathbf{\Sigma}_{jj}$'s are both positive definite.

In addition, the composites can be related via a structural model which constrains the correlation matrix $\mathbf{R}$ indirectly via a set of simultaneous equations:

$$\mathbf{B} \mathbf{c}_{\text{endogenous}}=\mathbf{C} \mathbf{c}_{\text{exogenous}}+\mathbf{z}$$,

where the vector $\mathbf{c}$ is partitioned in an exogenous and an endogenous part, and the matrices $\mathbf{B}$ and $\mathbf{C}$ contain the so-called path (and feedback) coefficients. Moreover, the vector $\mathbf{z}$ contains the structural error terms having a zero mean and being uncorrelated with $\mathbf{c}_{\text{exogenous}}$. As the model need not to be recursive, the matrix $\mathbf{B}$ is not necessarily triangular and the elements of $\mathbf{z}$ may be correlated.

== Model identification ==
To ensure identification of the composite model, each composite must be correlated with at least one variable not forming the composite. In addition to this non-isolation condition, each composite needs to be normalized, e.g., by fixing one weight per composite, the length of each weight vector, or the composite's variance to a certain value. If the composites are embedded in a structural model, also the structural model needs to be identified. Finally, since the weight signs are still undetermined, it is recommended to select a dominant indicator per block of indicators that dictates the orientation of the composite.

The degrees of freedom of the basic composite model, i.e., with no constraints imposed on the composites' correlation matrix $\mathbf{R}$, are calculated as follows:

df	=	number of non-redundant off-diagonal elements of the indicator covariance matrix
	-	number of free correlations among the composites
	-	number of free covariances between the composites and indicators not forming a composite
	-	number of covariances among the indicators not forming a composite
	-	number of free non-redundant off-diagonal elements of each intra-block covariance matrix
	-	number of weights
	+	number of blocks

== Model estimation ==
To estimate the parameters of a composite model, various methods that create composites can be used such as approaches to generalized canonical correlation, principal component analysis, and linear discriminant analysis. Moreover, a maximum-likelihood estimator and composite-based methods for SEM such as partial least squares path modeling and generalized structured component analysis can be employed to estimate weights and the correlations among the composites.

== Evaluating model fit ==
In CCA, the model fit, i.e., the discrepancy between the estimated model-implied variance-covariance matrix $\hat{\mathbf{\Sigma}}$ and its sample counterpart $\mathbf{S}$, can be assessed in two non-exclusive ways. On the one hand, measures of fit can be employed; on the other hand, a test for overall model fit can be used. While the former relies on heuristic rules, the latter is based on statistical inferences.

Fit measures for composite models include statistics such as the standardized root mean square residual (SRMR), and the root mean squared error of outer residuals (RMS$_{\theta}$). In contrast to fit measures for common factor models, fit measures for composite models are relatively unexplored and reliable thresholds still need to be determined. To assess the overall model fit by means of statistical testing, the bootstrap test for overall model fit, also known as Bollen-Stine bootstrap test, can be used to investigate whether a composite model fits the data.

== Alternative views on CCA ==
Besides the originally proposed CCA, the evaluation steps known from partial least squares structural equation modeling (PLS-SEM) are dubbed CCA. It is emphasized that PLS-SEM's evaluation steps, in the following called PLS-CCA, differ from CCA in many regards: (i) While PLS-CCA aims at conforming reflective and formative measurement models, CCA aims at assessing composite models; (ii) PLS-CCA omits overall model fit assessment, which is a crucial step in CCA as well as SEM; (iii) PLS-CCA is strongly linked to PLS-PM, while for CCA PLS-PM can be employed as one estimator, but this is in no way mandatory. Hence, researchers who employ CCA need to be aware which technique they are referring to.
