= Lavaan =

Open-source SEM software package for R

lavaan
- Original author: Yves Rosseel
- Developer: Yves Rosseel (main developer)
- Release: 11 May 2010; 16 years ago
- Stable release: Version 0.6-21, Released on CRAN / 21 December 2025; 9 months ago
- Written in: R
- Operating system: Windows, Linux, macOS
- Website: lavaan.ugent.be
- Repository: github.com/yrosseel/lavaan

lavaan, short for "Latent variable analysis", is an open-source structural equation modeling (SEM) package for the statistical programming language R. Created in 2010 by Yves Rosseel, now a full professor at the Department of Data Analysis, Faculty of Psychology and Educational Sciences, Ghent University, lavaan is intended to be a free open-source commercial-quality alternative to commercial SEM software packages such as Mplus or IBM's SPSS Amos.

== Comparison with other SEM packages ==
A variety of open-source, free, and commercial structural equation modeling software packages are available besides lavaan, such as Amos, SAS PROC CALIS, R package sem, OpenMx, LISREL, EQS, and Mplus. The main difference between packages is the presence of a graphical interface for model specification and presentation of results. Each package differs in terms of its strengths and weaknesses. lavaan was shown to be feature equivalent to commercial packages, with a compact scripting capability even for complex models as a key strength, and the ability to mimic Mplus and EQS results as a special feature. Its main weaknesses are the lack of an integrated graphical user interface and limited options to handle missing data.

== Impact ==
At present, lavaan is considered one of the standard structural equation modeling software packages used by researchers when conducting both observational and experimental research; evidenced in its use in studies, part of software reviews, and published books.

It has been downloaded more than 5 million times to date.

== Related R packages ==
Several R packages were developed that complement lavaan, such as:

- lavaangui: a graphical user interface for the R package lavaan in order to create and visualize lavaan models.
- lavaanPlot: an extension of lavaan to allow ploting of lavaan models.
- blavaan: an R package, co-developed by Yves Rosseel, for Bayesian latent variable analysis built upon the lavaan package.
- bmemLavaan: an R package for estimating and testing mediation eﬀects in models specified by lavaan.
