= Path coefficient =

Path coefficients are standardized versions of linear regression weights which can be used in examining the possible causal linkage between statistical variables in the structural equation modeling approach. The standardization involves multiplying the ordinary regression coefficient by the standard deviations of the corresponding explanatory variable: these can then be compared to assess the relative effects of the variables within the fitted regression model. The idea of standardization can be extended to apply to partial regression coefficients.

The term "path coefficient" derives from Wright (1921), where a particular diagram-based approach was used to consider the relations between variables in a multivariate system.

== See also ==
- Path analysis (statistics)
