= Latent growth modeling =

Statistical technique

Latent growth modeling is a statistical technique used in the structural equation modeling (SEM) framework to estimate growth trajectories. It is a longitudinal analysis technique to estimate growth over a period of time. It is widely used in the social sciences, including psychology and education. It is also called latent growth curve analysis. The latent growth model was derived from theories of SEM. General purpose SEM software, such as OpenMx, lavaan (both open source packages based in R), AMOS, Mplus, LISREL, or EQS among others may be used to estimate growth trajectories.

== Background ==
Latent Growth Models represent repeated measures of dependent variables as a function of time and other measures. Such longitudinal data share the features that the same subjects are observed repeatedly over time, and on the same tests (or parallel versions), and at known times. In latent growth modeling, the relative standing of an individual at each time is modeled as a function of an underlying growth process, with the best parameter values for that growth process being fitted to each individual.

These models have grown in use in social and behavioral research since it was shown that they can be fitted as a restricted common factor model in the structural equation modeling framework.

The methodology can be used to investigate systematic change, or growth, and inter-individual variability in this change. A special topic of interest is the correlation of the growth parameters, the so-called initial status and growth rate, as well as their relation with time varying and time invariant covariates. (See McArdle and Nesselroade (2003) for a comprehensive review)

Although many applications of latent growth curve models estimate only initial level and slope components, more complex models can be estimated. Models with higher order components, e.g., quadratic, cubic, do not predict even-increasing variance, but require more than two occasions of measurement. It is also possible to fit models based on growth curves with functional forms, often versions of the generalised logistic growth such as the logistic, exponential or Gompertz functions. Though straightforward to fit with versatile software such as OpenMx, these more complex models cannot be fitted with SEM packages in which path coefficients are restricted to being simple constants or free parameters, and cannot be functions of free parameters and data. Discontinuous models where the growth pattern changes around a time point (for example, is different before and after an event) can also be fit in SEM software.

Similar questions can also be answered using a multilevel model approach.
