= Jörg Henseler =

German quantitative methodologist and marketing scholar

- Citizenship: German
- Education: Technical University of Kaiserslautern (Diploma, Dr. rer. pol.)
- Occupations: Quantitative methodologist, marketing scholar, design thinker
- Employer: University of Twente (Chair of Product–Market Relations)
- Known for: HTMT criterion; PLS-SEM; H–O specification; Confirmatory composite analysis; composite-based SEM

Jörg Henseler is a German quantitative methodologist and marketing scholar. He is known for his methodological work on partial least squares structural equation modeling (PLS-SEM) and composite-based structural equation modeling, and for the development of the heterotrait–monotrait ratio of correlations (HTMT), a criterion for assessing discriminant validity. Two statistical concepts carry his name: Dijkstra-Henseler's rho (ρA), a reliability coefficient for PLS-SEM construct scores, and the Henseler-Ogasawara (H–O) specification as a means to incorporate composites into structural equation models.

== Education and career ==
Henseler studied industrial engineering (Diplom-Wirtschaftsingenieur) at the University of Kaiserslautern (Germany), and he completed his doctoral degree (Dr. rer. pol.) at the same institution in 2005 with a dissertation on consumer switching behavior in the electricity market, supervised by Friedhelm Bliemel.

In 2014, Henseler was appointed Chair of Product–Market Relations at the University of Twente, in the Faculty of Engineering Technology.

== Research ==
Henseler's research is in quantitative methodology for the social and business sciences, with an emphasis on structural equation modeling (SEM). His contributions include the development and refinement of variance-based SEM techniques, especially PLS path modeling; the HTMT criterion for discriminant validity; and the conceptualisation of composite-based SEM as a unifying methodological framework.

=== Partial least squares structural equation modeling ===
PLS-SEM is a variance-based structural equation modeling technique introduced by Herman Wold in the 1970s. A social network analysis identified Henseler as an important author in this field. Henseler's contributions to the method have addressed the measurement invariance of composites (MICOM), the modeling of moderating effects, multigroup analysis, second-order constructs, the consistency of estimates for reflective measurement models (consistent PLS) employing a correction for attenuation using Dijkstra-Henseler's rho (ρA), the development of goodness-of-fit indices and tests, and reporting guidelines, among others. Moreover, Henseler pointed to misconceptions in the PLS-SEM literature by means of commentaries.

=== HTMT criterion ===
The heterotrait–monotrait ratio of correlations (HTMT), introduced by Henseler, Ringle, and Sarstedt (2015), is a criterion for assessing discriminant validity in variance-based SEM. The authors proposed thresholds of 0.85 (strict) and 0.90 (lenient), beyond which two constructs are judged to lack discriminant validity.

The HTMT paper, published in the Journal of the Academy of Marketing Science, has been widely cited and adopted as a discriminant validity criterion in PLS-SEM software including SmartPLS and ADANCO.

A direct statistical extension of HTMT was later proposed by Sarstedt and Franke in the form of HTMT-inference, which uses bootstrapping to test whether the HTMT statistic is significantly different from 1. The later developed HTMT2 relaxes some requirements on the measurement model.

=== Composite-based structural equation modeling ===
Beginning in the mid-2010s, Henseler proposed reframing PLS path modeling as a special case of a broader composite-based SEM (CB-SEM) framework, in which constructs are represented as linear composites of their indicators rather than as common factors. This was elaborated in his 2021 monograph Composite-based Structural Equation Modeling: Analyzing Latent and Emergent Variables, published by Guilford Press.

Within this framework, Henseler introduced several methodological contributions, including a typology of constructs distinguishing between latent variables and emergent variables; the so-called Henseler–Ogasawara specification (H–O) for composites in SEM, synthesis theory as an auxiliary theory for composite models, and confirmatory composite analysis as a validation of interrelated composites.

== Selected publications ==
Henseler has authored or co-authored more than 140 journal publications.

- Henseler, J., Ringle, C. M., & Sinkovics, R. R. (2009). "The use of partial least squares path modeling in international marketing." Advances in International Marketing, 20, 277–319.
- Henseler, J., Dijkstra, T. K., Sarstedt, M., Ringle, C. M., Diamantopoulos, A., Straub, D. W., Ketchen, D. J., Hair, J. F., Hult, G. T. M., & Calantone, R. J. (2014). "Common beliefs and reality about PLS: Comments on Rönkkö and Evermann (2013)." Organizational Research Methods, 17(2), 182–209.
- Henseler, J., Ringle, C. M., & Sarstedt, M. (2015). "A new criterion for assessing discriminant validity in variance-based structural equation modeling." Journal of the Academy of Marketing Science, 43(1), 115–135.
- Henseler, J., Hubona, G., & Ray, P. A. (2016). "Using PLS path modeling in new technology research: updated guidelines." Industrial Management & Data Systems, 116(1), 2–20.
- Henseler, J. (2017). "Bridging design and behavioral research with variance-based structural equation modeling." Journal of Advertising, 46(1), 178–192.
- Henseler, J. (2021). Composite-based structural equation modeling: Analyzing latent and emergent variables. New York: Guilford Press.
- van Zeeland, E. & Henseler, J. (2025). Shaping Value — Marketing Through the Lens of Design, Amersfoort, NL: Floot.

== Awards and recognition ==
Henseler has been named a Clarivate Highly Cited Researcher, recognising that his published work ranks in the top 1% by citations for his field and year in the Web of Science index. He also appears on the Stanford–Elsevier Top 2% Scientists List; the 202 edition placed him among the 100 most impactful researchers in the world.

He has received paper awards for long-term impact from the Academy of Marketing Science and the European Marketing Academy, and has served on the editorial boards of Creativity and Innovation Management, the European Journal of Management and Business Economics, Industrial Management & Data Systems, and the Journal of Advertising.
