= Bengt O. Muthén =

Psychometrician

Bengt Olov Muthén
- Education: Uppsala University
- Scientific career
- Fields: Psychometrics; Statistics
- Workplaces: University of California, Los Angeles
- Doctoral advisor: Karl Gustav Jöreskog

Bengt Olov Muthén is a psychometrician and Professor Emeritus at the Graduate School of Education & Information Studies, University of California, Los Angeles. He is a former president of the Psychometric Society.
