= Karl Gustav Jöreskog =

Swedish statistician (born 1935)

- Born: 25 April 1935 (age 91); Åmål, Sweden
- Citizenship: Sweden
- Education: Uppsala University
- Occupation: Professor Emeritus in Uppsala University
- Known for: Linear structural equation models LISREL software Maximum likelihood factor analysis
- Scientific career
- Fields: Statistics; Psychometrics
- Workplaces: Uppsala University; Educational Testing Service
- Doctoral advisor: Herman Wold
- Doctoral students: Bengt O. Muthén

Karl Gustav Jöreskog (born 25 April 1935) is a Swedish statistician. Jöreskog is a professor emeritus at Uppsala University, and a co-author (with Dag Sörbom) of the LISREL statistical program. He is also a member of the Royal Swedish Academy of Sciences. Jöreskog received his bachelor's, master's, and doctoral degrees at Uppsala University. He is also a former student of Herman Wold. He was a statistician at Educational Testing Service (ETS) and a visiting professor at Princeton University.

== Research ==
Jöreskog proposed a reliable numerical method for computing maximum-likelihood estimates in factor analysis; similarly reliable methods were also proposed by Gerhard Derflinger, Robert Jennrich, and Stephen M. Robinson at roughly the same time. Jöreskog's Fortran codes helped to popularize factor analysis around the world. While working at the Educational Testing Service and giving lectures at Princeton University, Jöreskog proposed a linear model for the analysis of covariance structures, a fundamental contribution to structural equation modeling (SEM).

His other research interests include multivariate analysis, item response theory, statistical computing, and factor-analysis in geology.

== Awards ==
- In 1974 he was elected as a Fellow of the American Statistical Association.
- In 2007 Jöreskog received the Award for distinguished scientific applications of psychology from the American Psychological Association (APA).
- In 2004 he was awarded The Rudbeck Medal by Uppsala University.

== Selected bibliography ==
- Jöreskog, K. G. (1969). A general approach to confirmatory maximum likelihood factor analysis. Psychometrika, 34, 183–202.
- Jöreskog, K. G. (1970). "A general method for analysis of covariance structures". Biometrika. 57 (2): 239–251. doi:10.1093/biomet/57.2.239.
  - Reprinted as Jöreskog, K. G. (2001). "A general method for analysis of covariance structures". In D. M. Titterington and D. R. Cox (ed.). Biometrika: One Hundred Years. Oxford University Press. pp. 345–357. ISBN 0-19-850993-6.
- Jöreskog, K. G., and Goldberger, A. S. (1975). "Estimation of a model with multiple indicators and multiple causes of a single latent variable". Journal of the American Statistical Association. 70 (351): 631–639. doi:10.2307/2285946. JSTOR 2285946.
- Jöreskog, K. G., & Sörbom, D. (1979). Advances in factor analysis and structural equation models. New York: University Press of America.
- Jöreskog, K. G., & Moustaki, I. (2001). Factor analysis of ordinal variables: A comparison of three approaches. Multivariate Behavioral Research, 36, 347–387.
- Jöreskog, K. G., Olsson, Ulf H., & Wallentin, Fan Y. (2016). Multivariate Analysis with LISREL. Springer International Publishing AG. ISBN 9783319331522.

=== Festschrift ===
- Cudeck, R., Jöreskog, K. G., Du Toit, S. H. C., & Sörbom, D. (2001). Structural Equation Modeling: Present and Future : a Festschrift in Honor of Karl Jöreskog. Scientific Software International.

== See also ==
- Causality
- Confirmatory factor analysis
- Computational statistics
- Exploratory factor analysis
- Factor analysis
- Latent variable
- LISREL
- Maximum likelihood
- Measurement theory
- Multivariate analysis
- Multivariate statistics
- Ordinal variable
- Psychometrics
- Structural equation model
- Uppsala University
- Wold, Hermann
