= Rina Dechter =

Computer scientist

- רינה דכטר
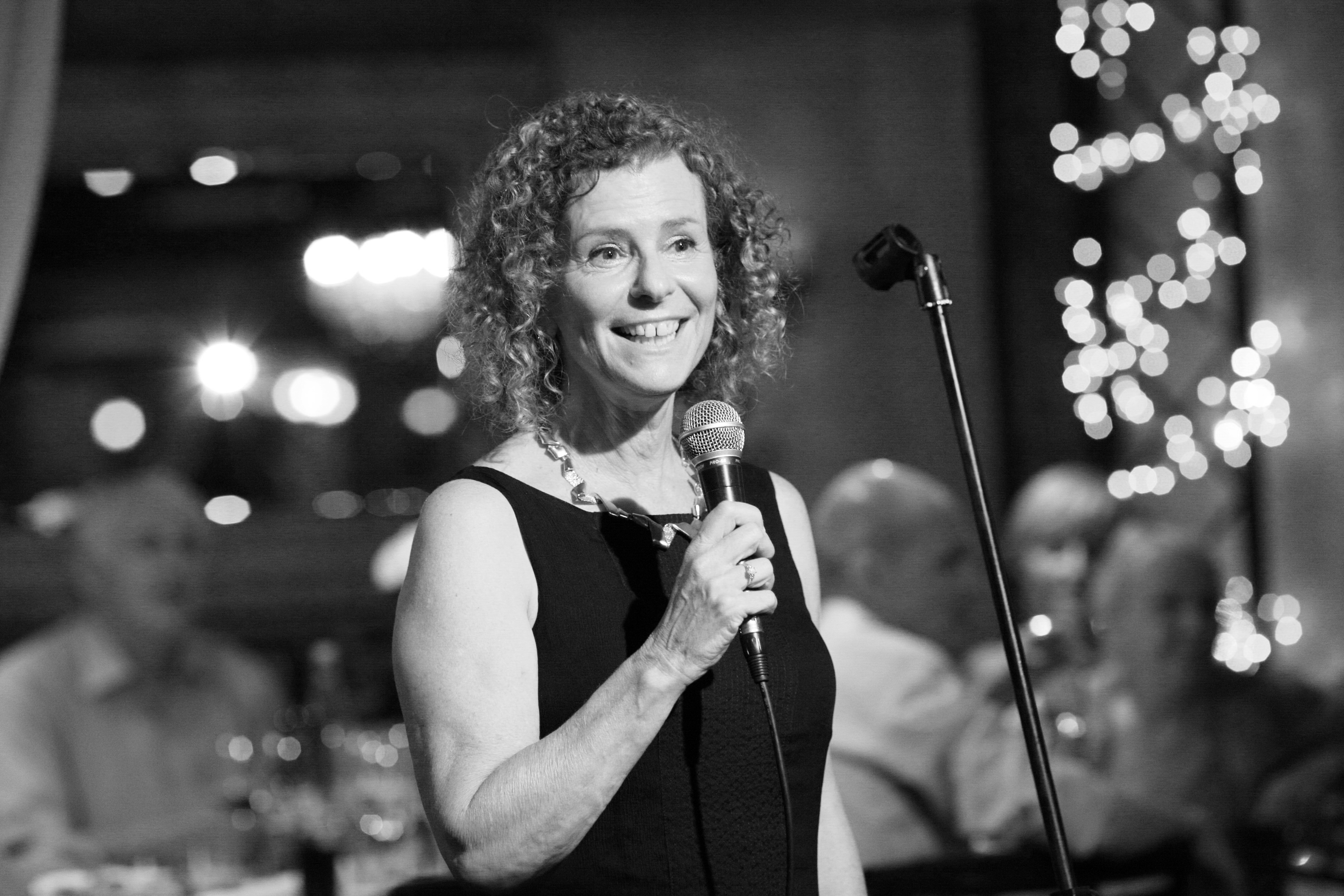
- Born: August 13, 1950 (age 76)
- Education: UCLA (1985, PhD); Weizmann Institute of Science (1976, MS); Hebrew University of Jerusalem (1973, BS)
- Scientific career
- Fields: Computer Science, Artificial Intelligence
- Workplaces: Hughes Aircraft Company; Technion; University of California, Irvine
- Thesis: Studies in the Use and Generation of Heuristics (1985)
- Doctoral advisor: Judea Pearl
- Website: www.ics.uci.edu/~dechter

Rina Dechter (Hebrew: רינה דכטר; born August 13, 1950) is a distinguished professor of computer science in the Donald Bren School of Information and Computer Sciences at the University of California, Irvine. Her research is on automated reasoning in artificial intelligence focusing on probabilistic and constraint-based reasoning. In 2013, she was elected a Fellow of the Association for Computing Machinery.

== Education ==
Dechter received her B.S. in mathematics and statistics from Hebrew University in 1973, her M.S. in applied mathematics from the Weizmann Institute in 1976, and her Ph.D. in computer science from the University of California, Los Angeles in 1985 as a student of Judea Pearl.

== Academic career and research ==
Dechter was a staff member at Hughes Aircraft Company from 1985 to 1988. She became a senior lecturer in computer science at the Technion from 1988 to 1990, after which she moved to the University of California, Irvine, where she became a full professor in 1996. She was a Radcliffe Fellow at Harvard University's Radcliffe Institute for Advanced Study from 2005 to 2006. From 2011 to 2018 she was the co-editor in chief of the scientific journal Artificial Intelligence,.

Dechter wrote a standard text in constraint programming called Constraint Processing published by Morgan Kaufmann Publishers in 2003. It was reviewed as a valuable graduate-level resource or reference work. She also co-edited a festschrift dedicated to her Ph.D. advisor Judea Pearl and his influence in the field of causal modeling and probabilistic reasoning, titled Heuristics, Probability, and Causality.

Dechter was the first to use the phrase deep learning, in a 1986 paper.

== Awards and honors ==
Dechter received a Presidential Young Investigator Award from the United States National Science Foundation in 1991, became a fellow of the American Association of Artificial Intelligence in 1994, and received an award for research excellence from the Association of Constraint Programming in 2007. In 2013, she was elected a fellow of the Association for Computing Machinery, cited "for contributions to the algorithmic foundations of automated reasoning with constraint-based and probabilistic information."
