= Christopher Hitchcock =

American philosopher (born 1964)

- Born: 1964 (age 61–62)

Education
- Education: Princeton University (BA), University of Pittsburgh (MA, PhD)

Philosophical work
- Era: 21st-century philosophy
- Region: Western philosophy
- Institutions: California Institute of Technology
- Main interests: philosophy of science

Christopher Hitchcock (born 1964) is an American philosopher and J. O. and Juliette Koepfli Professor of Philosophy at the California Institute of Technology. He is known for his works on philosophy of science.

== Books ==
- Making a Difference. Oxford University Press. Co-edited with Helen Beebee and Huw Price, 2017
- The Oxford Handbook of Probability and Philosophy. Oxford University Press. Co-edited with Alan Hájek, 2016
- The Oxford Handbook of Causation. Oxford University Press. Co-edited with Helen Beebee and Peter Menzies, 2009
- Contemporary Debates in the Philosophy of Science. Blackwell, 2004
