= LISREL =

Statistical software package

LISREL (linear structural relations) is a proprietary statistical software package used in structural equation modeling (SEM) for manifest and latent variables.

== History ==
LISREL was developed in the 1970s by Karl Jöreskog, then a scientist at Educational Testing Service in Princeton, New Jersey, and Dag Sörbom, later both professors of Uppsala University in Sweden.

== Command language, graphical user interface ==
LISREL is mainly syntax-based, although recent versions have featured a graphical user interface (GUI).

In early 2020, SSI was acquired by the Vector Psychometric Group, a US-based software and consulting company.

== See also ==
- Confirmatory factor analysis
- Multivariate analysis
- Path analysis (statistics)
- Structural equation modeling
