= Jerome J. Workman Jr. =

American science writer (born 1952)

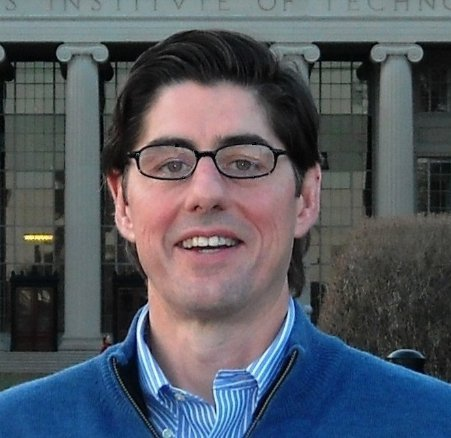
- Born: 6 August 1952 (age 74); Northfield, Minnesota, U.S.
- Education: Saint John's University (Minnesota), Saint Mary's University of Minnesota; Columbia Pacific University; Columbia Business School; MIT Sloan School of Management
- Awards: Williams–Wright Award; ASTM International Award of Merit; EAS Award; NYSAS Gold Medal Award
- Scientific career
- Fields: Natural sciences, biology, biological chemistry, business, analytical chemistry, spectroscopy

Jerome J. Workman Jr. is an American analytical spectroscopist, author, editor, and inventor born on August 6, 1952, in Northfield, Minnesota. Jerry Workman, Jerry Workman, Jr., and J.J. Workman are also names he uses for publishing.

== Early life and education ==
Workman was born on August 06, 1952, in Northfield, Minnesota. He attended Saint John's University (Minnesota) and later completed a B.A. (cum laude) degree, followed by a M.A. from Saint Mary's University of Minnesota. While at St. John's, Workman was co-captain of the wrestling team, two times Minnesota Intercollegiate Athletic Conference (MIAC) Champion (1971,1974) and later became head wrestling coach at St. Mary's in 1976. In addition, he was a National Catholic Intercollegiate Tournament (NCIT) Champion and was voted Outstanding Wrestler of the NCIT Tournament in 1972.

He went on to earn his PhD at Columbia Pacific University. Later, he entered the Columbia Executive Program at the Columbia Business School, completing the Columbia Senior Executive Program, the Certificate in Business Excellence, and the Certificate of Executive Development. At MIT Sloan School of Management he did further studies for a Certificate in Strategy and Innovation.

== Career ==
Workman has held appointments with the U.S. National Academies NRC panel for Assessment of NIST Programs from 2005 to 2007 and was given the U.S. Department of Commerce Certificate of Appreciation in 2007. He has served as executive editor (editor-in-chief) of Spectroscopy Letters, appointed 1999–2003; associate editor, Applied Spectroscopy Reviews (New York), appointed 1999–2004; editorial advisory board, and Spectroscopy Magazine (Oregon) since 1995. He was a Charter Member of U.S. Food and Drug Administration PAT and Chemometrics Committee in 2002. Workman has also been a member of various chemical and scientific advisory boards. Workman is also the holder of multiple patents, including twenty issued US patents.

In 1997 Workman worked with Elsevier Author Services as an editor of chief. Workman authored the three-volume Academic Press Handbook of Organic Compounds, and five-volume The Concise Handbook of Analytical Spectroscopy. He, along with co-author Howard L. Mark, have published over 150 successive columns on statistics and chemometrics for Spectroscopy Magazine since 1986. He has received the Williams–Wright Award, the ASTM International Award of Merit, the Eastern Analytical Symposium Award, and the New York Society for Applied Spectroscopy Gold Medal Award for his considerable volume of publications, reviews, and books.

== Publications ==
=== Selected technical works ===
- Mark, H.; Workman, J. (1991). Statistics in Spectroscopy (1st ed.). Academic Press. ISBN 978-0124725317.
- Workman, J. (1996). "Interpretive Spectroscopy for Near-Infrared". Applied Spectroscopy Reviews. 31 (3): 251. Bibcode:1996ApSRv..31..251W. doi:10.1080/05704929608000571.
- Workman, J. (1998). Springsteen, A. (ed.). Applied Spectroscopy: A Compact Reference for Practitioners. Academic Press. ISBN 978-0127640709.
- Workman, J. (July 1999). "Review of Process and Non-invasive Near-Infrared and Infrared Spectroscopy: 1993–1999". Applied Spectroscopy Reviews. 34 (1 & 2): 1–89. Bibcode:1999ApSRv..34....1W. doi:10.1081/ASR-100100839.
- Workman, J. (2000). The Academic Press Handbook of Organic Compounds: NIR, IR, Raman, and UV-VIS Spectra Featuring Polymers, and Surfactants (3 Volume Set). Academic Press. ISBN 978-0127635606.
- Workman, J. (2001). "Infrared and Raman Spectroscopy in Paper and Pulp Analysis". Applied Spectroscopy Reviews. 36 (2 & 3): 139–168. Bibcode:2001ApSRv..36..139W. doi:10.1081/ASR-100106154.
- Mark, H.; Workman, J. (2003). Statistics in Spectroscopy (2nd ed.). Elsevier – Academic Press. ISBN 978-0080541754.
- Roberts, C.; Workman, J.; Reeves, J. (2004). Near-Infrared Spectroscopy in Agriculture. ASA-CSSA-SSSA. ISBN 978-0891181552.
- Lavine, Barry K.; Workman, Jerome (2005). Chemometrics and Chemoinformatics, Chemometrics: Past, Present, and Future. ACS Symposium Series. Vol. 894. American Chemical Society. pp. 1–13.
- Workman, J. (2006). "Vision, Science Fiction and Technology in Afterburner: Looking Back to 1990 and Ahead to Spectroscopy in 2020…". NIR News. 17 (7): 5–7. doi:10.1255/nirn.922.
- Lavine, Barry; Workman, Jerry (2006). "Analytical Chemistry". Analytical Chemistry. 78 (12): 4137–4145. doi:10.1021/ac060717q. PMID 16771544.
- Workman, J.; Weyer, L. (2007). Practical Guide to Interpretive Near-Infrared Spectroscopy (1st ed.). CRC – Taylor and Francis. ISBN 978-1574447842.
- Mark, H.; Workman, J. (2007). Chemometrics in Spectroscopy (1st ed.). Elsevier – Academic Press. ISBN 978-0123740243.
- Lavine, Barry; Workman, Jerome (2008). "Analytical Chemistry". Analytical Chemistry. 80 (12): 4519–4531. doi:10.1021/ac800728t. PMID 18484744.
- Workman, J.; Weyer, L. (2009). Practical Guide to Interpretive Near-Infrared Spectroscopy (1st ed.). Chemical Industry Press. ISBN 978-7122063830.
- Lavine, Barry; Workman, Jerry (2010). "Analytical Chemistry". Analytical Chemistry. 82 (12): 4699–4711. doi:10.1021/ac101202z. PMID 20481510.
- Workman, Jerome Jr.; Lavine, Barry; Chrisman, Ray; Koch, Mel (2011). "Analytical Chemistry". Analytical Chemistry. 83 (12): 4557–4578. doi:10.1021/ac200974w. PMID 21500808.
- Workman, J.; Weyer, L. (2012). Practical Guide and Spectral Atlas to Interpretive Near-Infrared Spectroscopy (2nd ed.). CRC – Taylor and Francis. ISBN 978-1439875254.
- Workman, J. (2016). The Concise Handbook of Analytical Spectroscopy: Physical Foundations, Techniques, Instrumentation and Data Analysis. World Scientific Publishing-Imperial College Press. ISBN 978-9814508056.
- Mark, H.; Workman, J. (2018). Chemometrics in Spectroscopy (2nd ed.). Elsevier – Academic Press. ISBN 978-0128053096.
- Ciurczak, E.; Igne, B.; Workman, J. (2021). Handbook of Near-Infrared Analysis (4th ed.). CRC Press. ISBN 978-1138576483.
- Mark, H.; Workman, J. (2021). Chemometrics in Spectroscopy (Revised 2nd ed.). Elsevier – Academic Press. ISBN 978-0323911641.

=== Selected book chapters ===
- A. Roberts, Craig (2004). Near-Infrared Spectroscopy in Agriculture (Agronomy). American Society of Agronomy-Crop Science Society of America-Soil Science Society of America (published 2004-01-01). p. 822. ISBN 978-0891181552.
- Workman, J.; Weyer, L. (2009). Practical Guide to Interpretive Near-Infrared Spectroscopy (1st ed.). Chemical Industry Press. ISBN 978-1574447842.
- Mark, H.; Workman, J. (2018). Chemometrics in Spectroscopy. Academic Press. ISBN 978-0128053096.

== Additional sources ==
- Chemical & Engineering News announces Pittcon Research Awards 2009
- ASTM International News
- MIT Technology Review Blue is for Biohazard
