= Edmund R. Malinowski =

American chemist

- Occupation: Physical chemist

Academic background
- Education: Stevens Institute of Technology

Academic work
- Discipline: Chemometrics

Edmund R. Malinowski (October 1932 – February 2020) was an American professor of chemistry and is considered to be one of the great pioneers of the field of chemometrics. He published over 70 research papers and his 1980 book, Factor Analysis in Chemistry is acknowledged to be the first text on factor analysis applied to chemistry. Malinowski is credited with having an “enormous impact” on the field of chemometrics and the researchers who followed him.

== Education ==
Edmund R. Malinowski was born in October 1932, in Mahanoy City, PA. He obtained a Bachelor of Science in chemistry from The Pennsylvania State University in 1954. He obtained both a MS degree (1956) and PhD (1961) in physical chemistry at Stevens Institute of Technology, and was a Robert Crooks Stanley Graduate Fellow as a student during those years.

== Career ==
Malinowski went on to a long, distinguished academic career at the Stevens Institute of Technology. He joined the Institute's chemistry faculty in 1965 and became a full professor there in 1970. The Institute awarded him the 1977 Jess H. Research Award for his work on the theory and applications of factor analysis, and the 1994 Henry Morton Distinguished Professor Award, which honors excellence in research and teaching. He retired from Stevens Institute of Technology in 1997. Paul Gemperline summarized Malinowski's work at the time of his retirement in a Journal of Chemometrics editorial: "Over the course of his career as a chemist and educator he has published over 70 research papers and presented over 200 papers at seminars and professional meetings."

== Research ==
Before chemometrics was identified and named as a field of research and study by Kowalski and Wold in 1974, Malinowski was publishing work that would be regarded as chemometrics. His first paper on factor analysis was published in 1966.

== Influence and recognition ==
According to Paul Gemperline, prior to Malinowski's 1980 book, Factor Analysis in Chemistry, "factor analysis and principal component analysis were virtually unknown in the world of chemistry." Gemperline goes on to say Malinowski's book was "influential" not only because of the "timely" introduction of these topics but also because he had a "clear writing style … that chemists could understand". Malinowski was recognized for being generous in his acknowledgement and recognition of the work of others, citing their work in his own presentations and publications, which helped younger researchers to be successful.

Malinowski was recognized by his peers as a leader in the field of chemometrics in 1998 when he was awarded the Galactic Industries Award for Achievements in Chemometrics. After his 1997 retirement the Journal of Chemometrics published a special issue in Malinowski's honor.

== List of Honors and Awards ==
- 1957 – 1959: Robert Crooks Stanley Graduate Fellowship, Stevens Institute of Technology
- 1977: Jess H. Research Award, Stevens Institute of Technology,
- 1994: Henry Morton Distinguished Professor Award, Stevens Institute of Technology
- 1997: Special Issue: In Honor of Professor Malinowski's Retirement, Journal of Chemometrics,
- 1998: Galactic Industries Award for Achievements in Chemometrics
