= Paul J. Gemperline =

American analytical chemist and chemometrician

- Occupation: Analytical chemist

Academic background
- Education: Cleveland State University

Academic work
- Discipline: Chemometrics

Paul J. Gemperline (born 1955) is an American analytical chemist and chemometrician. He is a Distinguished Professor of Chemistry at East Carolina University (ECU) located in Greenville, North Carolina and has been the recipient of several scientific awards, including the 2003 Eastern Analytical Symposium Award in Chemometrics. He is author of more than 60 publications in the field of chemometrics. Dr. Gemperline served as Dean of the Graduate School at ECU from 2008 to 2022. He retired from ECU June 30, 2022 and is now professor emeritus.

== Education ==
Gemperline completed both undergraduate and graduate studies at Cleveland State University (CSU), graduating with a Bachelor of Science in Chemistry in 1978 and a Ph.D. in Analytical Chemistry in 1982. His dissertation was titled, "The Design of the Laboratory Network DISNET."

In 2014 CSU recognized Gemperline as a distinguished alumnus.

== Academic positions ==
Gemperline joined the chemistry faculty at East Carolina University (ECU) as an assistant professor in 1982. He was promoted to full professor in 1993. According to The Daily Reflector he had a long and distinguished teaching and research career at ECU with "more than 30 years of research experience in chemometrics involving 38 undergraduate students, 20 master's students, nine visiting doctoral students and six post-doctoral research assistants" and "more than 60 publications in the field and more than $1.8 million in external grant funds." He also is one of three inventors listed on a licensed patent for designing optical filters for chemical calibration. He received the Helms Award for Outstanding Research from the East Carolina University Chapter of Sigma Xi in 1987, the East Carolina University Distinguished Research Professor of Chemistry (award for 5-year achievement and permanent title) in 1999, and in 2001 was made an East Carolina University College of Arts and Sciences Distinguished Professor of Chemistry, an award for lifetime achievement and permanent title, given in recognition of "outstanding teaching and advising, research and creative productivity, and professional service."

In 2003 Gemperline joined the university administration as associate vice chancellor of research and graduate studies. He became dean of the Graduate School in 2008 and remained in that position until his retirement in 2022. Gemperline served in the positions of president-elect (2009-2010), president (2010-2011), and immediate past president (2011-2012) of the North Carolina Council of Graduate Schools.

== Scientific career ==
Gemperline came to the notice of a larger scientific community in 1984 with the publication of a paper describing DISNET in the Journal of Automated Methods and Management in Chemistry. (The journal title was changed to Journal of Analytical Methods in Chemistry in 2013.) Gemperline and his colleagues provided methodologies which underlay the improvements in calibration accuracy, computer-based data acquisition and mathematical analysis in chemometrics. The qualitative advances helped open new scientific fields such as molecular modeling and QSAR, cheminformatics, the '-omics' fields of genomics, proteomics, metabonomics and metabolomics, process modeling and process analytical technology.

Gemperline is a self-taught chemometrician, and he has been most influential by dispersing knowledge of his chemometric methodologies through his publications. Perhaps the best example of this is his book, Practical Guide to Chemometrics, for which he served as both editor and as a contributor. Better process methods can create inflection points that became the foundation for radical improvements and transitions in the scientific enterprise. It can be decades before the implications of particular advances are intuited, especially those related to the basic training of the next generations of chemists. His research in chemometrics has been "focused on development of new algorithms and software tools for analysis of multivariate spectroscopic measurements using pattern recognition methods, artificial neural networks, multivariate statistical methods, multivariate calibration, and non-linear model estimation." Sandia National Laboratories researcher, David Haaland, called Gemperline a "chemometrician extraordinaire," with a "deep understanding of chemometrics" and "wide-ranging" contributions to the research literature, and said after his first meeting with Gemperline he "always read his publications and attended his talks at conferences knowing that I would learn something new every time."

According to former graduate student, Patrick Cutler, another important aspect of Gemperline's research and teaching career has been his ability to collaborate with industry, which allowed "opportunities for students to gain invaluable experience." Cutler mentions pharmaceutical company Burroughs Wellcome in particular which at one time operated a production plant in Greenville, North Carolina, in close proximity to East Carolina University. Gemperline collaborated with Burroughs Wellcome in the 1980s to develop software for multivariate pattern recognition analysis of near-infrared reflectance spectra for rapid, non-destructive testing of pharmaceutical ingredients and products. His research and publications in this area furthered his international recognition. Cutler notes that Gemperline, "built his career and has produced world-renowned chemometrics research with the limited resources of mostly undergraduates and master's level students."

Gemperline also has had research collaborations with Pfizer, Inc. and GlaxoSmithKline and he has received "significant" funding for his research from the National Science Foundation (NSF) and the Measurement and Control Engineering Center (MCEC) at University of Tennessee, Knoxville, an NSF-sponsored Industry-University Cooperative Research Center (IUCRC). He collaborated with David Haaland at Sandia National Laboratories to develop chemometric tools to study kinetics in cells using hyperspectral fluorescence imaging. Their efforts were judged successful, and led to the 2010 Meggers Award for them and coauthors Patrick Cutler and Erik Andres for their two 2009 publications in Applied Spectroscopy about their research.

Gemperline served as the editor-in-chief of Journal of Chemometrics for ten years, from 2007 to 2017, and before that as the North American editor for five years, from 1996 to 2001. The journal honored him with a special issue in July 2020. He joined the editorial advisory board of Spectroscopy Magazine in 2020.

== Personal life ==
Outside of his scientific, teaching and administrative pursuits, Gemperline enjoys cycling, sailing, kayaking, photography and watching Dancing with the Stars on TV.

== Awards and honors ==
- 1983, 1984 NASA Lewis Research Center Summer Faculty Fellow
- 1985, 1986, 1987: Senior Visiting Scientist, Burroughs Wellcome Co.
- 1987: East Carolina University Sigma XI Helms Award for outstanding Research
- 1999: East Carolina University 5-Year Achievement Research/Creative Activity Award
- 2001: East Carolina University College of Arts and Sciences Distinguished Professor of Chemistry, Lifetime Achievement Award
- 2003: Eastern Analytical Symposium Award for Achievement in Chemometrics.
- 2010: Applied Spectroscopy William F. Meggers Award for outstanding paper appearing in Applied Spectroscopy
- 2014: Distinguished Alumni Award, Cleveland State University

== Publications ==
Gemperline is author of more than 60 peer-reviewed publications in the field of Chemometrics.

His most-cited publication is his book, Practical Guide to Chemometrics (CRC Press), for which he served as both editor and as a contributor. The chapters he contributed were based on the teaching notes he had developed at East Carolina University for use with undergraduate and master's degree level students.
