= Jeanette Grasselli Brown =

American chemist (1928–2025)

- Born: Jeanette Gecsy; August 4, 1928; Cleveland, Ohio, U.S.
- Died: July 15, 2025 (aged 96)
- Education: Ohio University
- Occupation: Chemist
- Spouse(s): Glenn Brown (1987–20??), Robert Grasselli (1957–1985)
- Parents: Nicholas Gecsy (father); Vera Gecsy (mother)
- Relatives: Robert Gecsy (brother)

Jeanette Grasselli Brown (August 4, 1928 – July 15, 2025) was an American analytical chemist and spectroscopist who is known for her work with Standard Oil of Ohio (now BP America) as an industrial researcher in the field of spectroscopy.

Spectroscopy is a technique used to measure the interaction of electromagnetic radiation with matter. Her areas of expertise encompass fields such as vibrational spectroscopy, combined instrumental techniques, computerized spectroscopy, and environmental spectroscopy. She developed new techniques to solve problems like identifying contaminants in gasoline, analyzing the makeup of new plastics, and analyzing environmental problems such as pollution.

During her career, Grasselli Brown has striven to bridge the gap between research and practical applications between industry and academia. She is considered one of the foremost contributors to infrared and Raman spectrometry of the 20th century.

== Early life ==
Grasselli Brown was born in 1928 to Hungarian immigrant parents Nicholas and Vera Gecsy. She grew up in a Hungarian neighborhood in the Buckeye Road area in Cleveland, Ohio during the Great Depression. Her parents valued education and encouraged her to receive a college education in spite of economic and family difficulties. Around 1946, her father opened a business in Elyria, Ohio, making sand cast aluminum parts. The foundry eventually failed and the family went bankrupt. Her brother Robert died from Hodgkin's lymphoma. While she was in college, her parents divorced.

== Education ==
Grasselli Brown attended Harvey Rice Elementary School, Alexander Hamilton Junior High and John Adams High School in Cleveland, Ohio. At John Adams, she was in a college track program and planned to major in English in college. However, when she took her first chemistry class, she fell in love with the subject. Her high school chemistry teacher told her if she majored in chemistry, he would be able to get her a scholarship to his alma mater, Ohio University, which he did.

Grasselli Brown graduated from John Adams High School in 1946, and attended Ohio University from 1946 to 1950. She worked in the chemistry department as an assistant and in the library. She was a member of Phi Beta Kappa. She was the only female chemist in her class and received her Bachelor of Science summa cum laude in 1950. In 1958, she received her Master of Science in chemistry from Case Western Reserve University.

Grasselli Brown has received thirteen honorary degrees from various institutions including Ohio University (1978), Clarkson University (1986), Michigan Technology University (1989), Wilson College (1994), Case Western Reserve University (1995), Notre Dame College (1995), Kenyon College (1995), Mount Union College (1996), Cleveland State University (2000), Kent State University (2000), Ursuline College (2001), Youngstown State University (2003), and University Pecs, Hungary (2002).

== Career ==
=== Standard Oil (BP America) ===
After graduating from Ohio University in 1950, Grasselli Brown was offered a job position at Standard Oil (now BP America) in Cleveland as a project leader. From 1950 to 1978, she worked closely with an instrument called an infrared spectrometer. This device is used to measure the absorbance, emission, and reflection of infrared light interacting with a molecule and also measures the vibrations of atoms to identify functional groups.

During her time at Standard Oil, Grasselli Brown used the infrared spectrometer to examine the concentration of materials, and sought to find industrial applications for it. As a project leader, she analyzed the formulations of World War II German airplane fuels to understand how the German planes were able to extend their flight ranges. She also consulted with the coroner's office in Cleveland to analyze unknown samples at crime scenes.

In 1978, she became the manager of the analytical science laboratory, working there until 1983. In 1983, she became the director of the technological support department, working there until 1985, when she became the first female director of corporate research from 1985 to 1988. Grasselli Brown retired in January 1989 as the company's highest ranking female employee.

=== Post-retirement ===
From 1989 to 1995, Grasselli Brown worked as a distinguished visiting professor and director of research enhancement at her alma mater, Ohio University. She has also served as a chair of the board of trustees, chair of the Ohio Board of Regents, a Foundation Board trustee for nine years, and a member of the Cutler Scholars Board of governors.

She served on numerous committees and boards such as the National Science Foundation Advisory Committee for Analytic Chemistry (1982–1984), the Energy Research Advisory Board of the U.S. Department of Energy (1987–1989), the visiting committee of the National Institute of Standards and Technology (1988–1991), and the Smithsonian Institution's exhibition advisory board (1990–1994). She chaired the U.S. National Committee of the International Union of Pure and Applied Chemistry from 1992 to 1995.

Grasselli Brown edited the international journal, Vibrational Spectroscopy. She was a member of the American Chemical Society, Coblentz Society, Federation of Analytical Chemistry and Spectroscopy Societies, and the American Association for the Advancement of Science. She was the president of the Society for Applied Spectroscopy in 1970. She was active in promoting women's careers as a member of the International Women's Forum and National Research Council's Committee on Women in Science and Engineering. She was an avid supporter of women in the workplace and defended part-time work for women, equal salaries, and corporate child-care facilities.

Grasselli Brown gave over 100 talks at scientific conferences, 100 seminars for graduate students, and over 500 lectures to the general public. She continued to be widely requested as a speaker and consultant on industrial and environmental problems. She traveled to Eastern Europe to teach the use of spectroscopy for soil, air, and water pollution issues.

=== Civic involvement ===
Grasselli Brown served on the boards of numerous non-profit organizations such as the Cleveland Hungarian Development Panel, the Cleveland Orchestra, the Great Lakes Science Center, the Cleveland Clinic Foundation, Breakthru, the Holden Arboretum, Martha Holden Jennings Foundation, Musical Arts Association of the Cleveland Orchestra, One Community, IdeaStream, the Cleveland Scholarship Programs, Inc., and the Northeastern Ohio Science and Engineering Fair.

== Personal life and death ==
Grasselli Brown has been married twice, to coworker Robert Grasselli (1957–1985) and to coworker Glenn Brown (1987–20??). Brown had two children from his previous marriage, Robyn and Eric; they now have three grandchildren. Jeanette continued to use the name Grasselli since it is the name she was known by professionally.

Brown died on July 15, 2025, at the age of 96.

== Legacy and honors ==
Grasselli Brown has over ninety publications, nine books, and a patent in the field of infrared and Raman spectroscopy.

In 1985, she was selected as one of the Foremost Women of the 20th Century. She is the first woman to be inducted into the Hungarian and Austrian Chemical Societies. In 2002, Grasselli Brown received the National Ellis Medal of Honor and was selected as an International Scientist of the Year.

In 1991, Grasselli Brown was the first woman to be inducted into the Ohio Science and Technology Hall of Fame. She was inducted into the Ohio Women's Hall of Fame in 1989 and is also a member of the Cleveland International Hall of Fame. In 2004, Grasselli Brown was chosen to be a part of the book "Ohio 200 years, 200 Women: Ohio's First and Finest."

As of 2013, Jeanette Grasselli Brown donated her papers to the Mahn Center for Archives and Special Collections at her alma mater, Ohio University.

In 2022, a permanent exhibit at the Great Lakes Science Center, entitled "Interactive Periodic Table of Element", was created through a donation by the Northeastern Ohio Science & Engineering Fair, in honor of Dr. Jeanette Grasselli Brown and her husband Dr. Glenn Brown.

== Publications ==
- CRC atlas of spectral data and physical constants for organic compounds, Volume 3 (1975)
- Infrared and Raman Spectroscopy, Part 1 (1976)
- Chemical applications of Raman spectroscopy (1981)
- The Analytical approach (1983)
- 1985 International Conference on Fourier and Computerized Infrared Spectroscopy (1985)
- Handbook of data on organic compounds, Volume 11 (1992)

== Awards ==
- Distinguished Service Award of the Society for Applied Spectroscopy (1985)
- Garvan Medal from the American Chemical Society (1986)
- Fisher Award in Analytical Chemistry from the American Chemical Society (1993)
- Wilfred R. and Ann Lee Konneker Award from Ohio University (2003)
- Founder's Citation Award from Ohio University (2003–2004)
- Great American Award from the Stan Hywet Foundation (2004)
- In Tribute to Public Service Award (2006)
- Leona Hughes Inspiration Award by the Women in Philanthropy of Ohio University (2010)
- President's Medal of Merit from the Republic of Hungary (2012)
- Lifetime Ambassador's Award from OneCommunity (2014)
- Alumni Association's Medal of Merit from Ohio University
- Alumna of the Year Award from Ohio University
- John C. Baker Founders Award from Ohio University
- Pittcon Heritage Award (2025)
