= List of East Carolina University faculty =

This is a list of East Carolina University faculty. Active faculty members are listed with green backgrounds.

== Faculty and staff ==
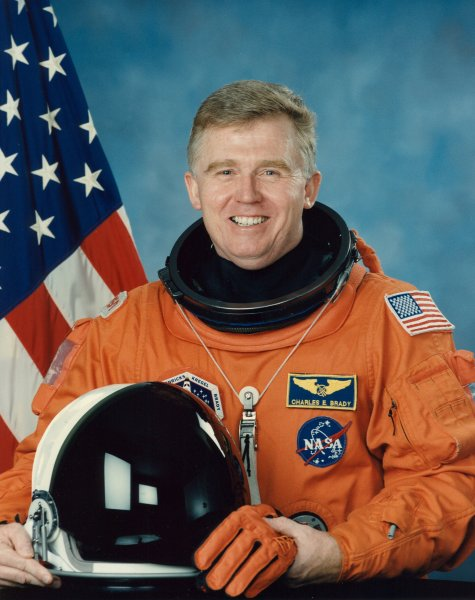
Charles E. Brady Jr.

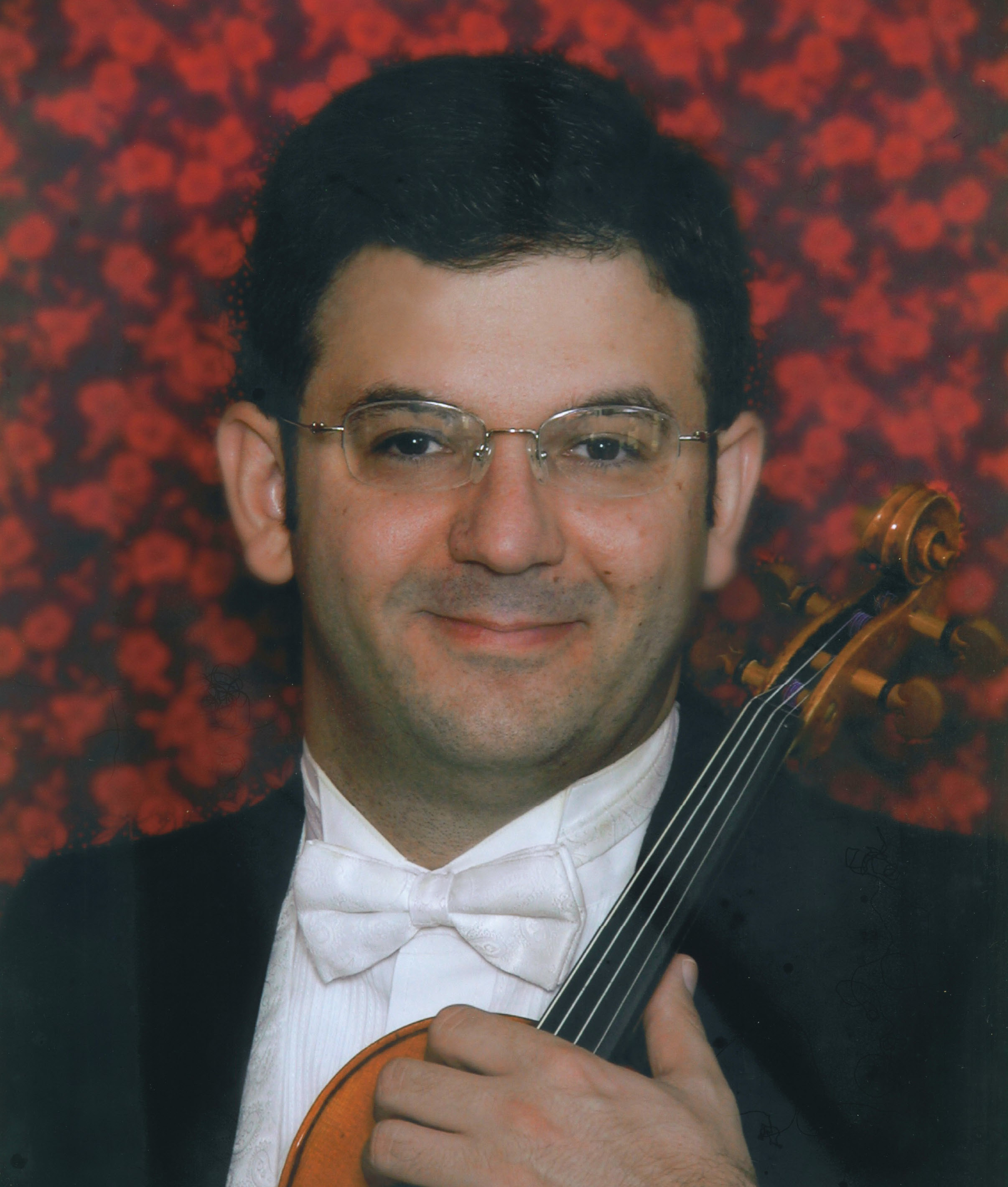
Selim Giray

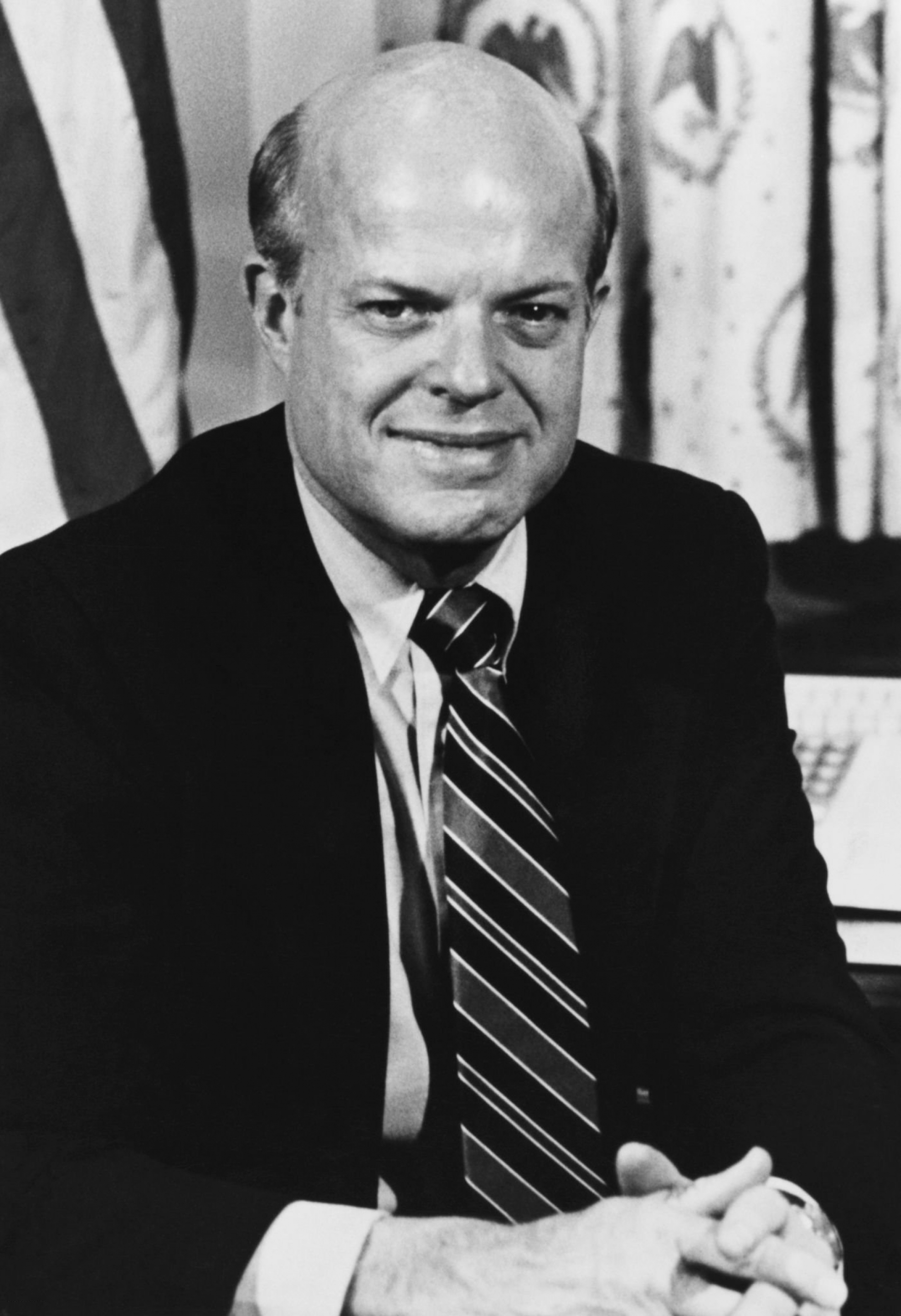
John Porter East

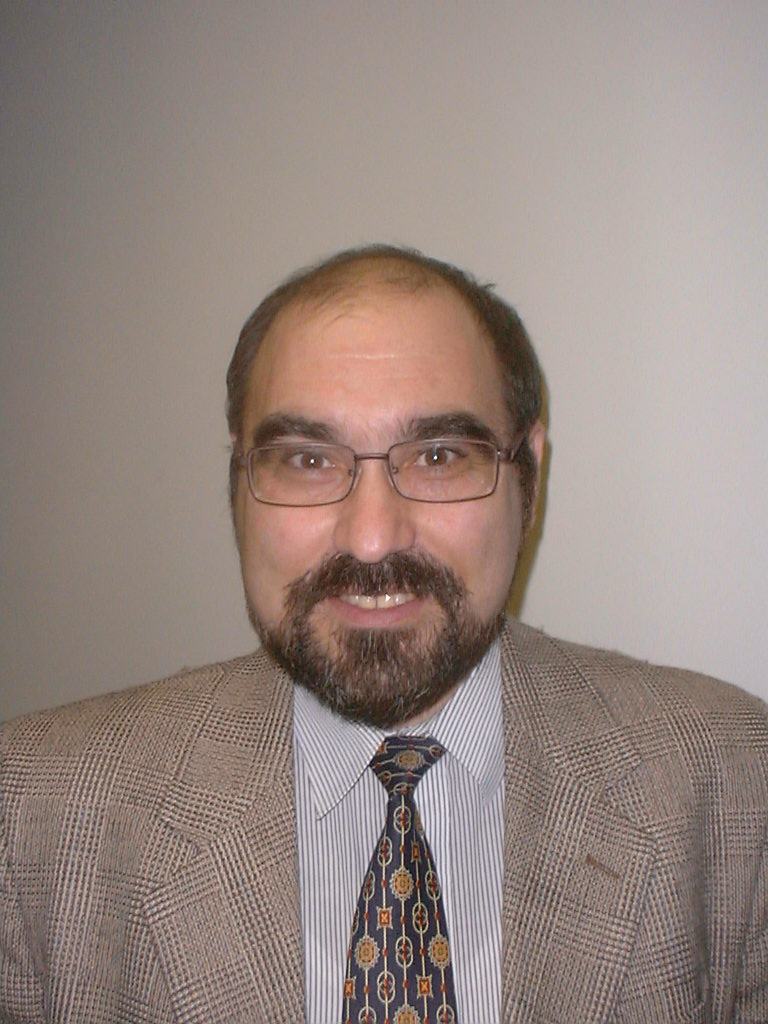
Sergiy Vilkomir

Name	Position(s)	Joined college	Left/retired	Alumnus/na?	Reference
Lawrence Babits	George Washington Distinguished Professor of History; director of Maritime Studies		(active)	(no)	
Judith Bailey	Senior executive director of Enrollment Management, East Carolina; former president of Northern Michigan University and Western Michigan University	2007	(active)	(no)	
Jason Bond	Associate professor of Biology		(active)		
Charles E. Brady Jr.	Team physician; NASA astronaut	1984	1985	(no)	
W. Randolph Chitwood	Director, East Carolina Heart Institute; senior associate vice chancellor for Health Sciences; chief of Cardiothoracic and Vascular Surgery; past president of the Society of Thoracic Surgeons; pioneer in minimally invasive and robotic heart surgery; past president and a founding member of the International Society of Minimally Invasive Cardiac Surgery	1984; 1989	1988; (active)	(no)	
John Porter East	Professor of Political Science; U.S. senator	1964	1980	(no)	
Robert Ebendorf	Carol Grotnes Belk Distinguished Professor of Art	1997	(active)	(no)	
Paul J. Gemperline	Dean, Graduate School; Associate vice chancellor, Division of Research and Graduate Studies; College of Arts and Sciences Distinguished Professor of Chemistry; Editor-in-Chief, Journal of Chemometrics	1982	(retired, 2022)	(no)	
Selim Giray	Joint fellowship from East Carolina and North Carolina Symphony Orchestra	1992		1992 M.M.	
James Houlik	Music	1966	1977	(no)	
Hanna Jubran	Professor of Art-Sculpture and Sculpture Area coordinator	1994	(active)	(no)	
Martin Mailman	Music	1961	1966	(no)	
Peter Makuck	Professor emeritus of English; former Fulbright Exchange professor; founder of Tar River Poetry	1976	2006	(no)	
Oyeleye Oyediran	Center for International Studies	1993	1993	(no)	
William N. Still Jr.	History	1968	1994 (Emeritus)	(no)	
Sergiy Vilkomir	Associate professor and head of the Software Testing Research Group	2008	2020	(no)	
Luke Whisnant	Professor of English	1982	(active)	B.A. 1979	
Liza Wieland	Professor of English	2007	(active)	(no)	
