= Raman Tool Set =

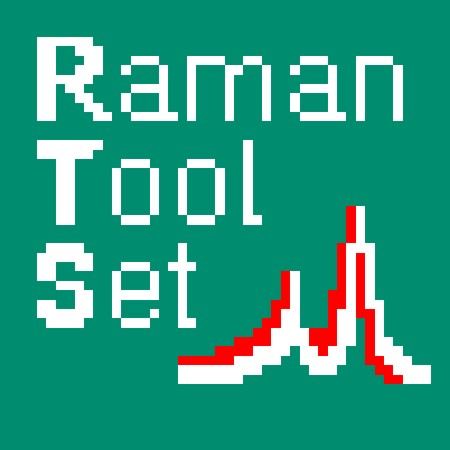

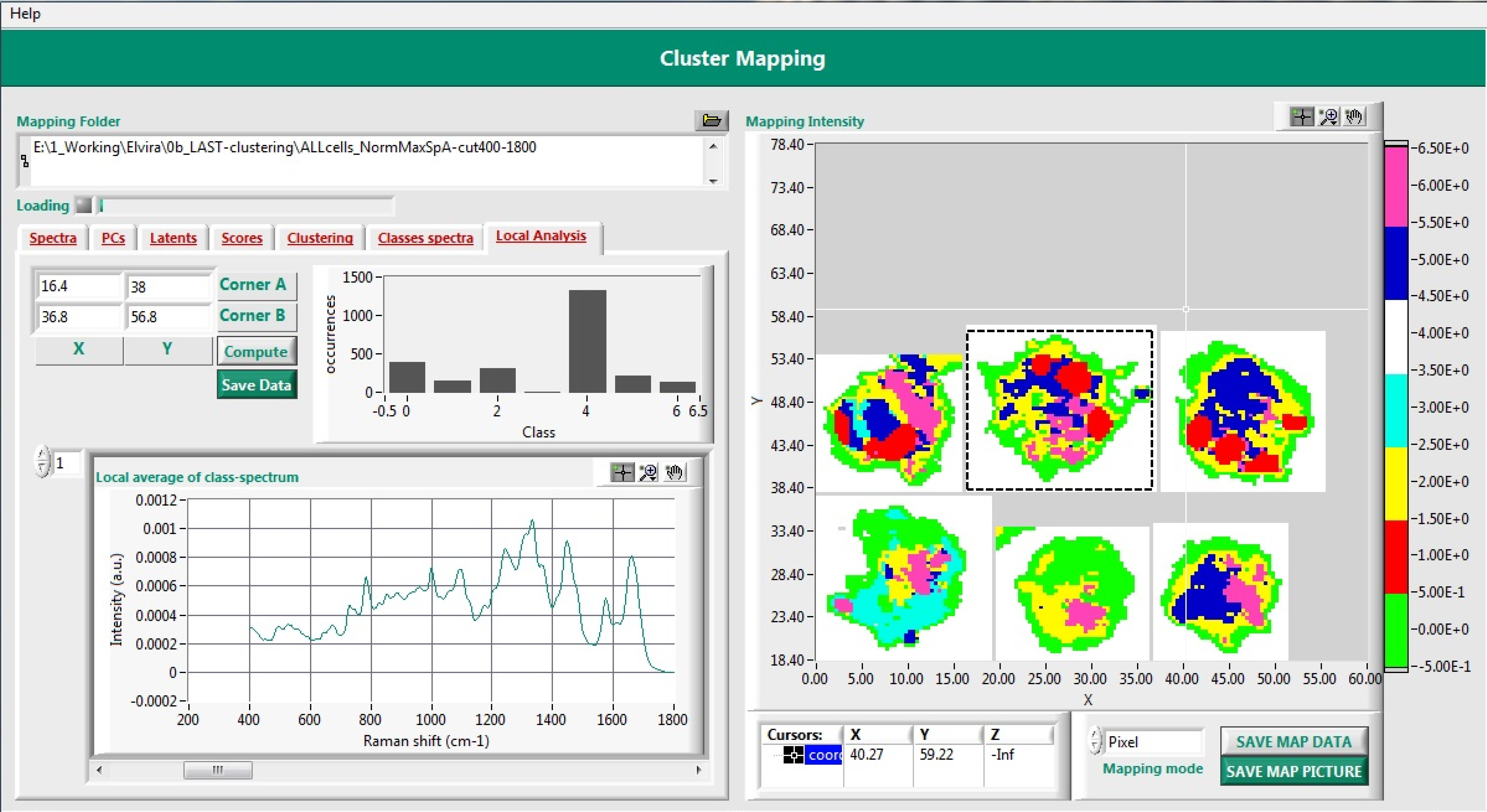
- Developer(s): BioNEM Lab
- Stable release: 2.1.0 / 2017
- Operating system: Windows
- Type: Spectroscopy, Multivariate analysis, Spectral data analysis
- License: freeware
- Website: ramantoolset.sourceforge.net

Raman Tool Set is a free software package for processing and analysis of Raman spectroscopy datasets. It has been developed mainly aiming to Raman spectra analysis, but since it works with 2-columns datafiles (Intensity vs Frequency) it can deal with the results of many spectroscopy techniques.

Beyond the spectra preprocessing steps, such as baseline subtraction, normalization of spectra, smoothing and scaling, Raman Tool Set allows the user for chemometric analysis by means of principal component analysis (PCA), extended multiplicative signal correction (EMSC) and cluster analysis. Chemometric and multivariate data analysis can also be applied to hyperspectral maps, using PCA, independent component analysis (ICA) and cluster analysis.

Raman Tool Set is currently developed at BioNEM Lab of the University "Magna Graecia" of Catanzaro, Italy.
