= Williams–Wright Award =

Award has been given by the Coblentz Society

The Williams–Wright Award is an award that honors extraordinary or outstanding work in spectroscopic measurements while working in an industrial setting. The award has been given by the Coblentz Society annually since 1978 with the Awardee being selected by a committee of leading spectroscopists. The Award citations reads, "The Coblentz Society proudly presents the Williams–Wright Award to --- for his/her outstanding contributions to the Field of Industrial Spectroscopy."

The Williams–Wright Award is presented at the Pittsburgh Conference on Analytical Chemistry and Applied Spectroscopy, familiarly known as Pittcon, and the largest annual conference on analytical chemistry and applied spectroscopy.

== Recipients ==
Source: CoblenzSociety

- 1978 Norman Wright
- 1979 Norman Colthup
- 1980 Jeanette Grasselli
- 1981 Paul Wilks/James Harrick
- 1982 Robert Hannah
- 1983 Harry Willis
- 1984 Robert Jakobsen
- 1985 Clara D. Craver/Richard A. Nyquist
- 1986 Abe Savitsky/Joseph J. Barrett
- 1987 A. Lee Smith
- 1988 Darwin L. Wood
- 1989 D. Bruce Chase
- 1990 John F. Rabolt
- 1991 Robert J. Obremski
- 1992 Timothy Harris
- 1993 Curtis Marcott
- 1994 John M. Chalmers
- 1995 Michael R. Philpott
- 1996 Robert G. Messerschmidt
- 1997 Michael J. Pelletier
- 1998 Henry Buijs
- 1999 Donald Kuehl
- 2000 John A. Reffner
- 2001 Raul Curbelo
- 2002 Isao Noda
- 2003 Neil Everall
- 2004 Neil Lewis
- 2005 Fran Adar
- 2006 Harry Owen
- 2007 Michael Carrabba
- 2008 Rina Dukor
- 2009 Jerome J. Workman, Jr.
- 2010 Patrick Treado
- 2011 Howard Mark
- 2012 Richard Crocombe
- 2013 John Coates
- 2014 Mike Doyle
- 2015 Jagdeesh Bandekar
- 2016 Drouet Warren Vidrine
- 2017 Slobodan Sasic
- 2018 Charles R. (Chuck) Anderson
- 2019 Wolfgang Petrich
- 2020 Christopher D. Brown
- 2021 Ian R. Lewis
- 2022 Paul Pudney
- 2023 Craig Prater

== See also ==
- List of business and industry awards
- List of chemistry awards
- List of prizes named after people
