= Bruce R. Kowalski =

American analytical chemist and chemometrician

- Occupation: Analytical chemist

Academic background
- Education: University of Washington

Academic work
- Discipline: Chemometrics

Bruce R. Kowalski (March 1942 – December 2012) was an American professor of analytical chemistry who is acknowledged by the world-wide scientific community to be one of the founders of the field of chemometrics. He was the founding editor of Journal of Chemometrics, and the founding director of the Center for Process Analytical Chemistry at University of Washington in Seattle. Kowalski and Svante Wold formed the Chemometrics Society, which would later become the International Chemometrics Society.

== Education ==
As an undergraduate, Kowalski attended Millikin University, double majoring in chemistry and mathematics. He completed his PhD in chemistry at University of Washington in 1969 under researcher Tom Isenhour.

== Career ==
=== Early years ===
After obtaining his PhD, Kowalski worked briefly for Shell Development. He left Shell in 1971 for Lawrence Livermore Laboratory where he and C. F. Bender worked together to help develop Livermore's proprietary PATTRN data analysis system.

=== University professor ===
In 1972 he joined the chemistry faculty at Colorado State University as an assistant professor. He moved to the University of Washington in 1974 where he stayed until his retirement in 1999. He became a full professor in 1979 and an endowed professor of analytical chemistry in 1991. The chemistry department's newsletter, Chem Letter, reported that ten companies contributed to the endowment and that it was the first endowed professorship at the university "established through a consortium of industrial and state resources." Former graduate student David Duewer summarized Kowalski's accomplishments in the Journal of Chemometrics: "32 PhD and three MS students, over 230 research publications, editorials, chapters, and reports (32 in this journal) with 144 coauthors, more than 230 invited lectures, four patents, more than 50 quarters of undergrad and graduate sections spread over 18 courses, more than $22m in grants, and – not least – founder of this journal."

=== Director of CPAC ===
Kowalski served as the inaugural director of the Center for Process Analytical Chemistry (CPAC), established in 1984, at the University of Washington. Initially CPAC was a National Science Foundation (NSF) Industry-University Cooperative Research Center (IUCRC). It has since been renamed Center for Process Analysis and Control and has become self-sustaining. Writing for Analytical Chemistry, Alan Newman called CPAC the "brainchild" of Kowalski, who proposed the idea in 1982, and said in the field of analytical chemistry, "CPAC offers a unique model of how chemists can successfully forge bonds with industry, government, and allied academic disciplines to foster new ideas. At the same time, the center establishes a two-way flow of ideas between basic researchers in academia and scientists in industry and government."

=== Editor of Journal of Chemometrics ===
Kowalski was the founding editor of the Journal of Chemometics, the first issue of which came out in January 1987. The editorial of the first issue, written by Kowalski, Steven Brown and Bernard Vandeginst, explains that after 10 years of the founding of the field of chemometrics and 20 years of researchers actually doing chemometrics and having their publications "widely distributed through the literature," it was time for a journal "to bring together papers on how chemists use mathematics and statistics in their work in novel ways and also on potentially new tools that chemists may find useful in the future." After his death the journal published a special issue in his honor in May 2014. It also established the annual Kowalski Prize for the best theoretical and applied papers published in the journal in the two preceding years.

=== Company founder ===
Kowalski and colleague Gerald Erickson founded the chemometrics company, Infometrix, in Seattle in 1978.

== A Founder of Chemometrics ==
A foundational discourse on the field of chemometrics by Kowalski, "Chemometrics: Views and Propositions," was published in 1975. In it he defines chemometrics as "any and all methods that can be used to extract useful chemical information from raw data." Kowalski takes up the question of what constitutes "new and viable research" in the field and goes on to explain how his training as an analytical chemist and experience with pattern recognition as a tool for chemical analysis has influenced his opinion about this. The included letter to a "prospective chemometrician," signed by Kowalski and Svante Wold, asserts "chemometrics should not involve theoretical calculations, but should deal primarily with the extraction of useful chemical information from measured data." The letter announces that an informal "Chemometrics Society" was begun on June 10, 1974, describes the purposes of the society and invites the interested researcher to join. Kowalski's research group was given as the Laboratory for Chemometrics, Department of Chemistry, University of Washington, and Wold's research group was given as Research Group for Chemometrics, Institute of Chemistry, Umea University, Sweden. This society, formed from Kowalski's and Wold's two research groups, eventually became the International Chemometrics Society.

Wold had coined the term "chemometrics" for a grant application in 1971. He and Kowalski first met in 1973 at a symposium in Tucson, Arizona, and after discussion, Kowalski agreed to use the term to describe his own research as well. Wold says Kowalski became "both a strong proponent and spokesman for this new field."

== Research ==
In his presentation at a 2019 chemometrics conference in France, Steven Brown called Kowalski the "father" of the following areas of chemometrics: 'NAS methods (with K. Booksh), multiway methods (with E. Sanchez), heuristics in chemistry (with C. Bender), multi-algorithms in chemistry for “big data” ( > 16 kb)'.

Responding to a question posed during a 1988 interview, Kowalski felt that his most impactful paper to date was the one he wrote with C. Bender, published in the Journal of the American Chemical Society in 1972, "Pattern recognition. A Powerful approach to interpreting chemical data". Wold categorized this publication as a "seminal" paper in pattern recognition in chemistry.

Kowalski's areas of interest outside of chemometrics were analytical instrumentation, remote sensing, process modeling, and chemical sensors in process analysis and control.

== Personal life ==
In his spare time Kowalski enjoyed horse-breeding and riding, sailing, hiking and backpacking, his Harley-Davidison motorcycle and skiing. According to Chemical & Engineering News, "After his retirement in 1999, Kowalski joined the Fort Lewis Mesa fire department in Durango, Colo., where he specialized in the handling of hazardous materials. Kowalski and his companion dog, Chaco-Bob, were a key part of the district’s canine search and rescue program."

== Legacy ==
The Society for Applied Spectroscopy was selected by Kowalski's family to administer an award in Kowalski's name, the Bruce R. Kowalski Award in Chemometrics - Administered by the Society for Applied Spectroscopy, "to honor the legacy of Professor Kowalski by recognizing outstanding young researchers in the field of chemometrics and by extension, for advanced mathematical and/or statistical methods in chemistry."

The University of Washington has three scholarships set up in Kowalski's honor, the Kowalski Excellence in Graduate Education Fund, Bruce Kowalski Endowed Fund for Graduate Student Support, and the chemistry department's Bruce R. Kowalski Endowed Fund in Chemistry.

In 2015 the American Chemical Society published a symposium series in Kowalski's honor, 40 Years of Chemometrics – From Bruce Kowalski to the Future.

The Kowalski Prize, worth $1,000, is given annually by the Journal of Chemometrics, alternating between "the 'best theoretical paper' and 'best applied paper' published in the journal in the previous two years."

== List of Honors and Awards ==
- 1985: Pittsburgh Analytical Chemistry Award
- 1988: Malcolm E. Pruitt Award from the Council for Chemical Research
- 1989: Theophilus Redwood Endowed Lectureship from the Royal Society of Chemistry
- 1991: Endowed Professor of Analytical Chemistry, University of Washington
- 1993: Torbern Bergman Medal from the Swedish Chemical Society’s analytical division
