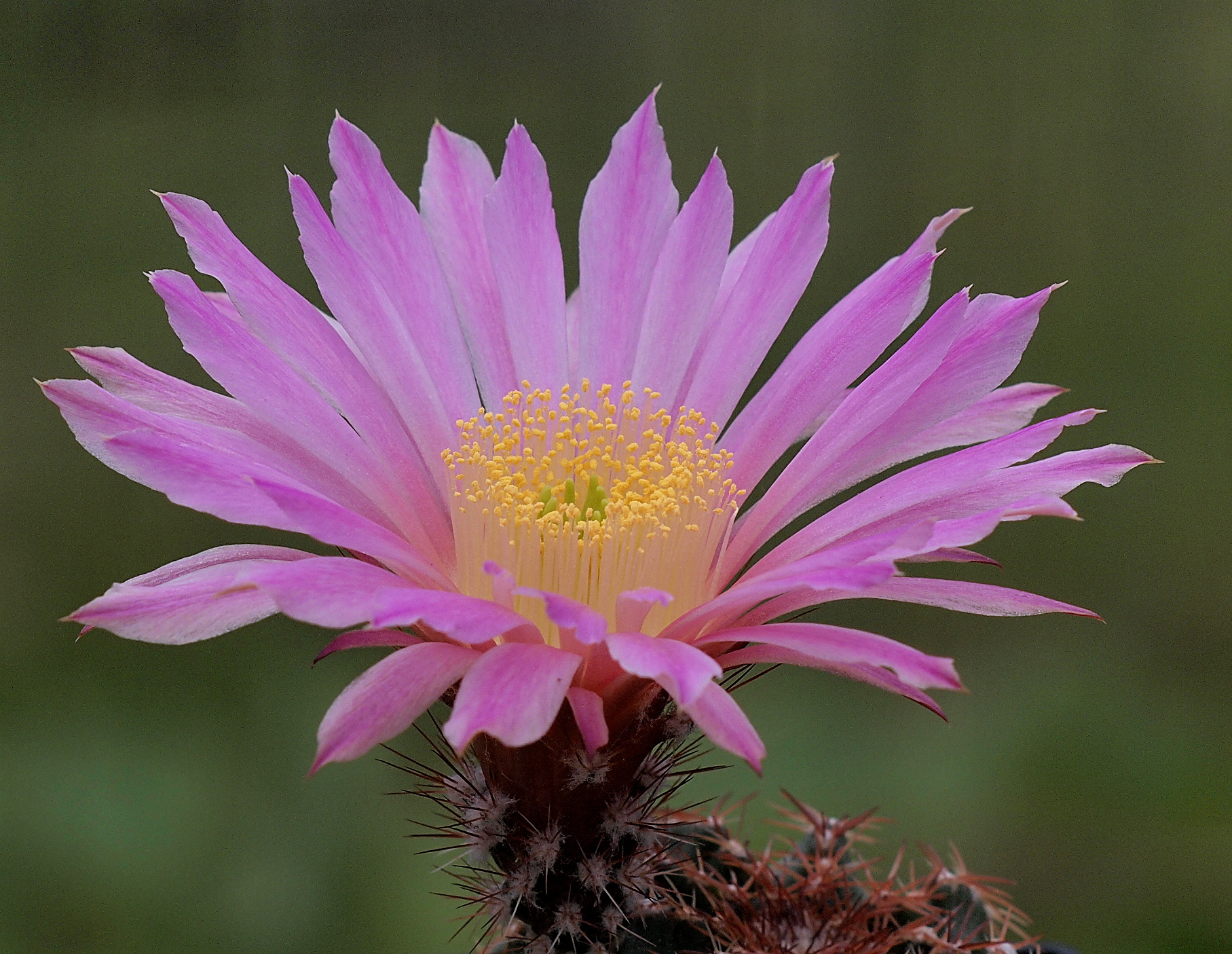

Conservation status
- Endangered (IUCN 3.1)

Scientific classification
- Kingdom: Plantae
- Clade: Embryophytes
- Clade: Tracheophytes
- Clade: Angiosperms
- Clade: Eudicots
- Order: Caryophyllales
- Family: Cactaceae
- Subfamily: Cactoideae
- Genus: Echinocereus
- Species: E. weinbergii

Binomial name
- Echinocereus weinbergii Weing.

Synonyms
- Echinocereus pulchellus subsp. weinbergii (Weing.) N.P.Taylor 1997; Echinocereus pulchellus var. weinbergii (Weing.) N.P.Taylor 1985

= Echinocereus weinbergii =

Species of cactus

Echinocereus weinbergii is a species of cactus native to Mexico.

== Description ==
Echinocereus weinbergii grows solitary almost spherical to spherical, green to stems reach height of 20.8 to 38.8 mm (0.82 to 1.53 in) a diameter of 13.2 to 33.2 mm (0.52 to 1.31 in). There are ten to sixteen low and wide ribs. There are 3-11 thick radial spines that are 2 to 13.9 mm (0.079 to 0.547 in) long growing on round narrowly elliptical areoles. The short, funnel-shaped flowers are pale pink to purple and appear near the tips or sides of the shoots. They are 28 to 64.3 mm (1.10 to 2.53 in) long and reach a diameter of 30 to 66.6 mm (1.18 to 2.62 in). The spherical, purple-colored, 10 to 18 mm (0.39 to 0.71 in) long by 9 to 15 mm (0.35 to 0.59 in) wide with black seeds.

== Subspecies ==
There are two recognized subspecies:

Image	Scientific name	Distribution
	Echinocereus weinbergii subsp. venustus (W.Blum & W.Rischer) Gómez-Quint. & Dan.Sánchez	Mexico (Jalisco, Zacatecas, San Luis Potosí)
	Echinocereus weinbergii subsp. weinbergii	Mexico (W. Zacatecas, Aguascalientes, San Luis Potosí)

== Distribution ==
Plants are found in xeric scrubland and pinyon pine forest in Aguascalientes, San Luís Potosí, Jalisco, and Zacatecas.

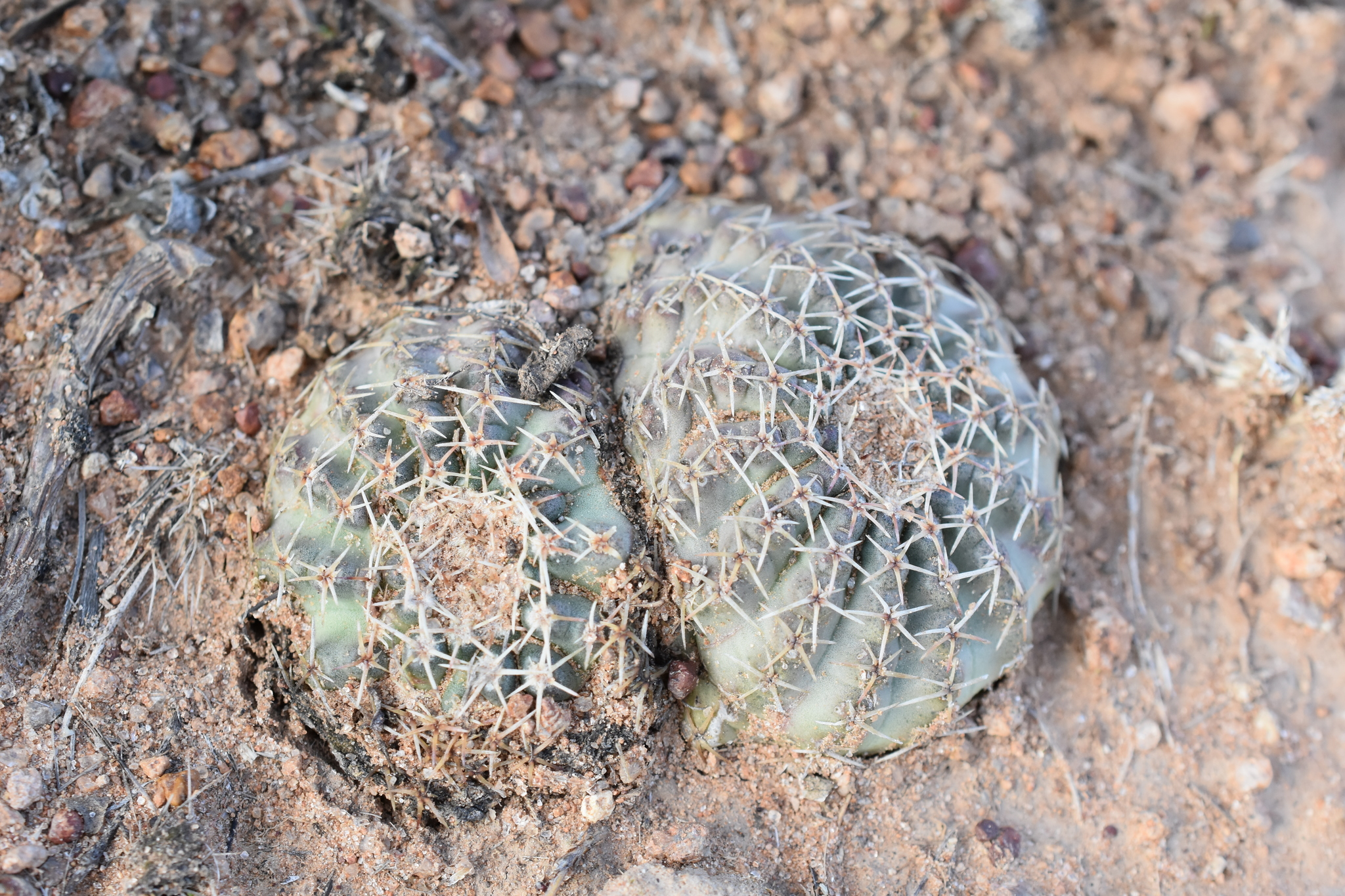
Echinocereus weinbergii ssp. venustus growing in habitat in El Carmen, San Luis Potosi, Mexico

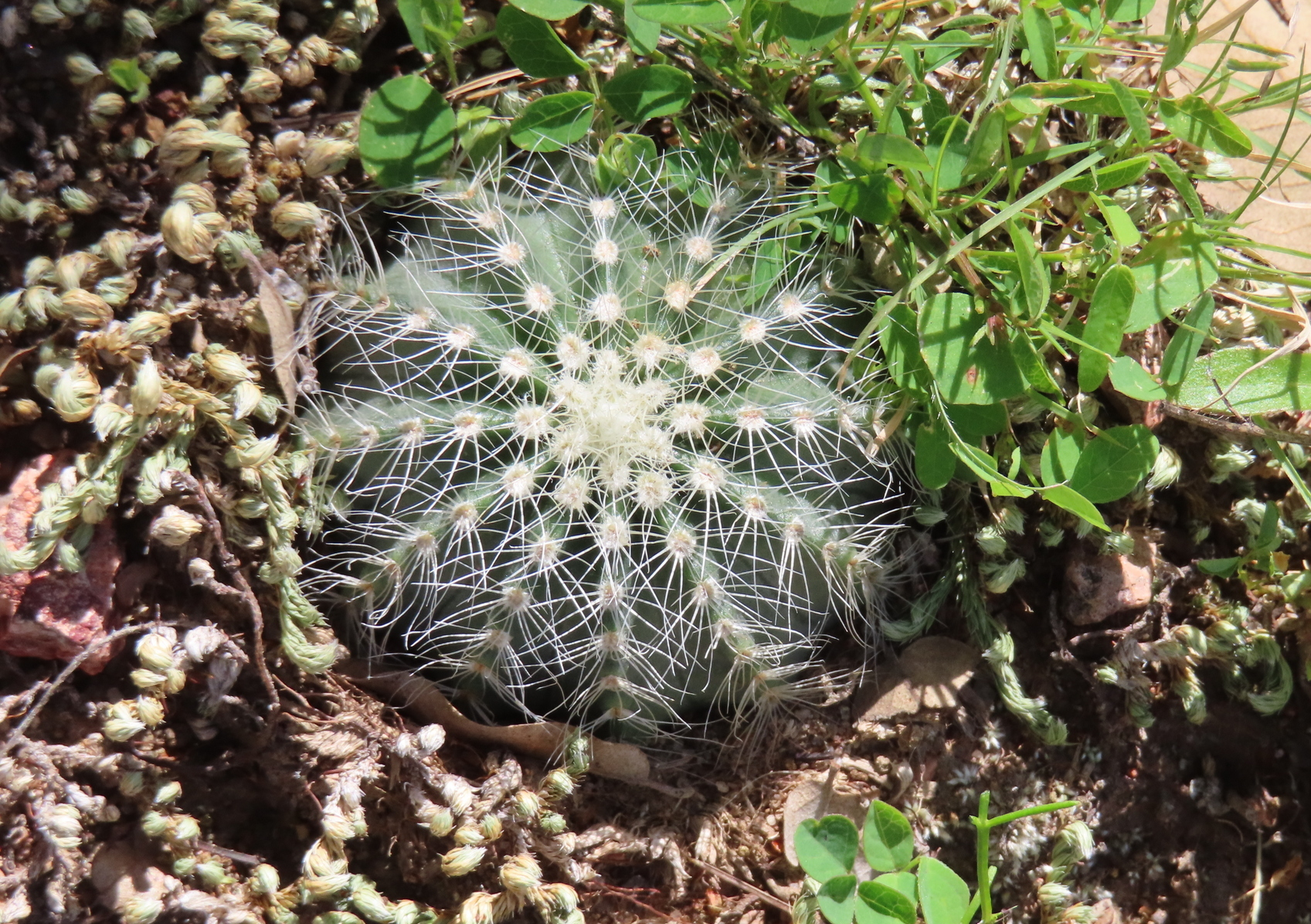
Echinocereus weinbergii ssp. weinbergii growing in Zacatecas, Mexico

== Taxonomy ==
Plants were distinguished from Echinocereus pulchellus by Weingart in 1912. They were reclassified to a variety by Taylor in 1985 and a subspecies in 1997. It was recognized by Sanchez et al. as a separate species in 2020 based on multivariate analysis.
