= Næs =

Næs is both a middle name and a surname. Notable people with the surname include:

- Sunniva Næs Andersen (born 1996), Norwegian handball player
- Halvor Næs (1928–2022), Norwegian ski jumper
- Jónas Tór Næs (born 1986), Faroese footballer
- Lív Næs, Faroese singer-songwriter
- Thormod Næs (1930–1997), Norwegian sport shooter
- Tormod Næs, Norwegian statistician
