= Eastern Analytical Symposium =

The Eastern Analytical Symposium (EAS) and Exposition is an American organization that sponsors a Symposium and Exposition generally held in Princeton, New Jersey, every November. The Symposium is attended by over 2000 scientists and typically contains several hundred papers by the world's leading authorities on analytical chemistry.

The associated exposition contains information on technology and information from companies that provide instrumentation and services for the community of analytical scientists. In addition, the EAS provides an ongoing education program that includes technical short courses and professional development workshops for laboratory scientists, as well as general-interest sessions directed at the public, especially students and their chemistry teachers.

== Sponsors ==
The Eastern Analytical Symposium and Exposition is sponsored by the following organizations: the Analytical Division of the American Chemical Society, the American Chemical Society New York and New Jersey Sections, the American Microchemical Society, the Chromatography Forum of Delaware Valley, the Coblentz Society, the New York Microscopical Society, the Society for Applied Spectroscopy's Delaware Valley, New York, and New England Sections, the Association of Laboratory Managers (ALMA), and the New Jersey Association of Forensic Scientists.

== Awards ==
The Governing Board of the Eastern Analytical Symposium presents awards each year for outstanding contributions and achievements in general analytical chemistry and in five specific areas of analysis. The award inscriptions read, "In Recognition of Outstanding Achievements in the Field of -----".

- Analytical Chemistry
- Magnetic Resonance
- Vibrational spectroscopy
- Chemometrics
- Mass Spectrometry
- Separation Science or Chromatography

The Governing Board each year also honors a Young Investigator who is making an impact on the field of analytical chemistry. The 2017 Awardee will be Prof. Dwight R. Stoll.

In addition to the EAS Awards, awards presented by sponsoring organizations at the Symposium include:

- The Benedetti-Pichler Award of the American Microchemical Society
- The Ernst Abbe Award of the New York Microscopical Society
- The Gold Medal of the New York Society for Applied Spectroscopy

From 2012 to 2014, an award was also presented to a New Faculty active in NMR.

Past award recipients can be found here.

== History ==
Since its founding in 1959, EAS has become a premier venue for analysts to learn about new technologies, new applications for older technologies, and developments in such diverse fields as bioanalysis, pharmaceutical analysis, forensic science, laboratory management, and environmental analysis. Throughout the years, the EAS has been the place where innovations in analytical science have been introduced to the community of analytical scientists.

The first EAS was held in 1959 at the Hotel New Yorker in New York City, with 1200 attendees at 12 technical sessions. The exposition had 38 exhibitors who displayed the latest in analytical supplies and instrumentation. During the early years in New York, the EAS was held at various hotels in the city, as the attendance grew. At the 10th EAS, a workshop on electrochemical techniques was the origin of the exhibitor workshops, which later would become a standard feature of the EAS program. By the 15th symposium, major awards were given out as part of the program of the Symposium, including the Meggers Memorial Award, the Hassler Award in Applied Spectroscopy, and the Anachem Award.

In 1973, the EAS was suspended to support the emerging FACSS (Federation of Analytical Chemistry and Spectroscopy Societies), whose meetings were held at a similar time of the year. After two years, an EAS mini-symposium was held, and in 1977, the EAS returned to its original format in New York City. During the late 1970s and the 1980s, the EAS was moved from location to location New York City, as attendance continued to expand. During this period, the Governing Board of the Eastern Analytical Symposium began to present its own awards for excellence in analysis. In 1986, the first EAS Award for Outstanding Contributions in the Fields of Analytical Chemistry was presented to Professor George Morrison, who - aside from his many scientific contributions - had been instrumental in the early development of EAS. At the same meeting, the EAS Award for Outstanding Contributions to Separations Science was presented to Professor Csaba Horvath. In subsequent years, EAS awards of contributions to other areas would be added to recognize contributions to various areas of analysis. Currently, the EAS presents the six major awards listed above to distinguished scientists from around the world at the annual Symposium.

As the 1990s dawned, it became necessary for the Eastern Analytical Symposium to find a venue for the meeting to meet the needs of a growing meeting. In 1990, the EAS moved to the then-new Garden State Convention and Exhibit Center in Somerset, New Jersey. As the symposium continued to grow, even the GSCEC seemed limited. In 2000, the EAS was moved to the Atlantic City Convention Center, where it remained for two years. However, beginning in the early 2000s, it was decided to move the EAS back to the Garden State Convention and Exhibit Center.

Although the Eastern Analytical Symposium started as a regional meeting, where persons interested in practical analytical chemistry from laboratories in the Northeast could meet to discuss problems of common interest, it has grown to international stature, with attendance from analysts from laboratories in companies and universities across the world. The Symposium has further grown to emphasize a wide variety of technologies and areas of application that could only be dreamed of in 1959. Applications to traditional areas of analysis are still represented among the talks, but unique to the Eastern Analytical Symposium are areas such as cultural heritage and forensic science. As the 21st century has dawned, EAS continues to provide an inclusive home for practical analytical studies, to educate about the latest technologies, and to inform its audience about the current state of analysis.

After several decades of holding the meeting in Somerset, NJ, the annual symposium was moved to nearby Princeton, NJ in 2017.
