= Tormod Næs =

Norwegian statistician (born 1954)

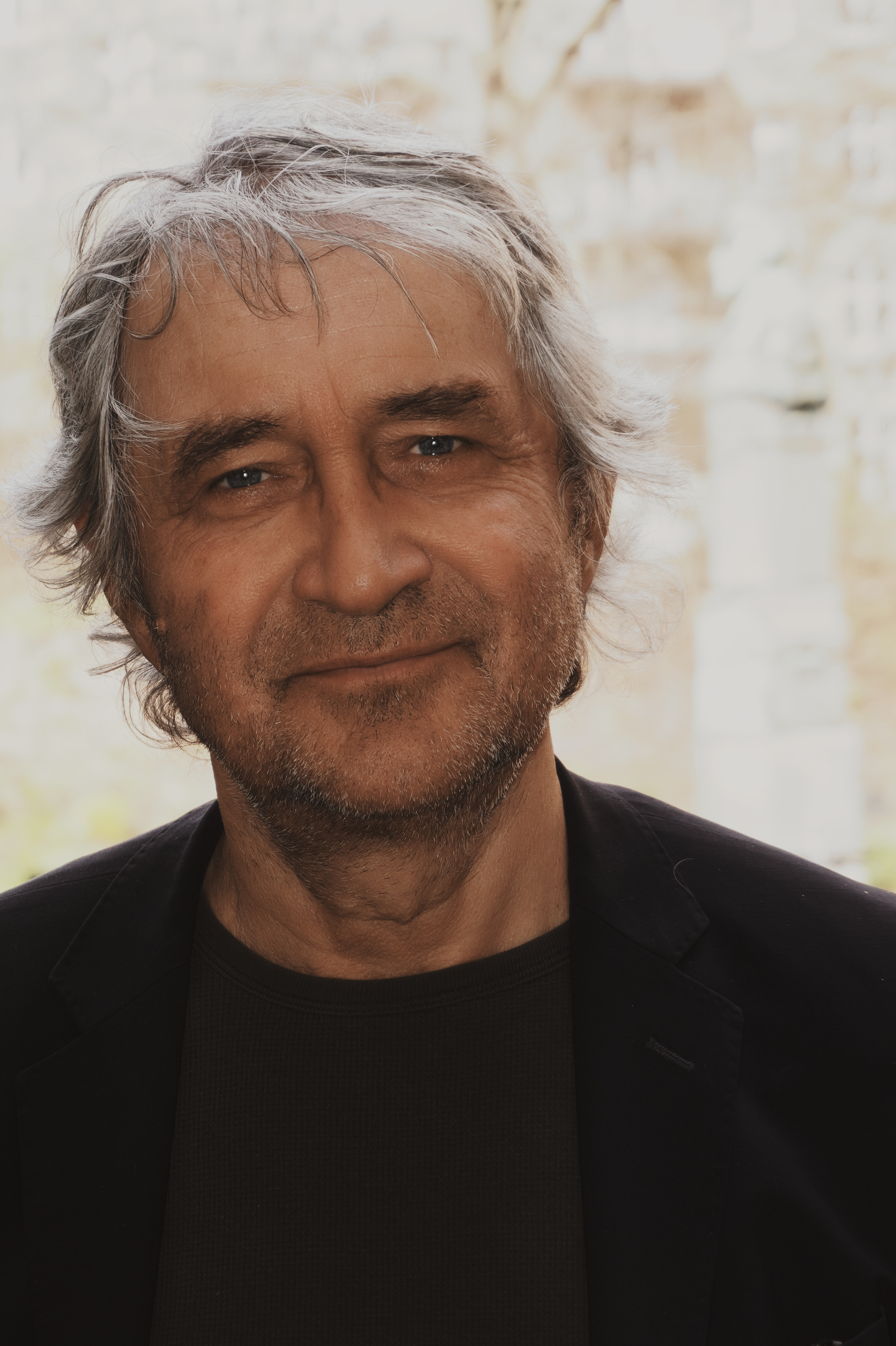
- Occupation: Statistician

Academic background
- Education: University of Oslo

Academic work
- Discipline: Chemometrics

Tormod Næs (born February 11, 1954) is a Norwegian statistician working in chemometrics and sensometrics. He studies multivariate statistical analysis, spectroscopy, food science, and sensory science. His impact on chemometrics is exemplified by the over 8,000 citations to his most well-known book, Multivariate Calibration (with Harald Martens), and the awards in chemometrics that he has received.

== Education ==
Tormod Næs obtained both his master's degree (1978) and PhD (1984) in statistics from University of Oslo.

== Career ==
For most of his career Næs has worked at Nofima (Norwegian Food Research institute) at Ås, achieving the title of Senior Scientist. He has been a professor at the University of Oslo, the University of Copenhagen, and Stellenbosch University. Næs has had four long research and guest professor periods abroad; at University of Washington (Seattle), University of Delaware, University of Genova and University of Firenze.

Næs was member of The Board of Directors, Matforsk (now Nofima) for four years, chairman of the 8th Sensometrics Conference: Imagine the Senses, held August 2006 in Ås, chairman of the organising committee for the ‘PLS’07: 5th International Symposium on PLS and Related Methods (September 2007) and chairman of the 16th Scandinavian Symposium on Chemometrics (SSC16): Chemometrics in Action (June 2019).

During his time at Nofima, Næs has been project and task leader of a number of research projects financed by Research Council of Norway and EU (Marie Curie). Among these was "ConsumerCheck," a four-year (2009–2012) international project which involved researchers working in collaboration with Nofima from their home bases in South Africa, Denmark, and the Netherlands. Consumercheck website Næs headed the project "RapidCheck" at Nofima. This was a project which studied rapid method for food producers to test their products and to understand better why consumers eat what they eat. Næs served as the project leader for "Panelcheck" for eight months (September 1, 2007–May 5, 2007). PanelCheck is a well established open source software package of multiple statistical and graphical tools used within the field of sensometrics for performance analysis of trained sensory panels. It was developed by researchers at MATFORSK (Norwegian Food Research Institute), the Technical University of Denmark (DTU) and the University of Copenhagen.

Næs has been European editor of Journal of Chemometrics (2003–2005) and served as associate editor of Technometrics (2007–2008). He is currently (as of 2023) on the editorial board of Food Quality and Preference, Journal of Chemometrics and Italian Journal of Applied Statistics (Statistica Applicata).

Næs has supervised 24 PhD students to their final degree.

== Influence and recognition ==
Tormod Næs has a large production of scientific papers and books and has an h-index (as of March 2023) equal to 48 in Web of Science and equal to 66 in Google Scholar. He is particularly known to researchers in chemometrics for his ability to combine multivariate statistics with applied areas in spectroscopy and sensory science, in this way building bridges between these areas.

Næs and Tomas Isaksson received the Thomas Hirshfeld Award in NIR Analysis, given by the International Council for Near Infrared Spectroscopy (ICNIRS) to recognize contributions to NIR spectroscopy, in 1997. In their award address, Isaksson spoke about the role of NIR spectroscopy in food quality, and Næs spoke about the use of principal component analysis, least squares regression, and Euclidean distance or Mahalanobis distance in chemometrics.

In 1997 Næs was awarded the Eastern Analytical Symposium (EAS) Award for Outstanding Achievements in Chemometrics, an award that recognizes analytical chemists.

In 2012 Næs and coauthors O. Tomic, B. H. Mevik, and H. Martens received the Kowalski Prize from the Journal of Chemometrics for their paper "Path modelling by sequential PLS regression" (2011).

== Honors and awards ==
- 1997: Tomas Hirschfeld award in NIR analysis (with Tomas Isaksson)
- 1997: EAS Award for Outstanding Achievements in Chemometrics
- 2004: Kowalski Prize in Chemometrics (with coauthor Ingunn Berget)(Journal of Chemometrics)
- 2006: Kowalski award in chemometrics (J. Wiley and Sons)
- 2006: Honorary member of the Chemometric Society of Norway
- 2012: Kowalski Prize in Chemometrics (with coauthors O. Tomic; B. H. Mevik; and H. Martens) (Journal of Chemometrics)
- 2014: Member of the Norwegian Academy of Technological Sciences
- 2023: T he 16th Herman Wold medal in Gold from the Chemometrics Division of the Swedish Chemical Society (Svenska Kemisamfundet)
