= Federation of Analytical Chemistry and Spectroscopy Societies =

- Abbreviation: FACSS
- Formation: 1972
- Purpose: Science education and communication
- Headquarters: Santa Fe, NM
- Official language: English
- Website: http://facss.org/ https://scixconference.org/

The Federation of Analytical Chemistry and Spectroscopy Societies or FACSS is a scientific society incorporated on June 28, 1972, with the goal of promoting research and education in analytical chemistry. The organization combined the many smaller meetings of individual societies into an annual meeting that includes all of analytical chemistry. The meetings are intended to provide a forum for scientists to address the development of analytical chemistry, chromatography, and spectroscopy.

The society's main activity is its annual conference held every fall. These conference offer plenary sessions, workshops, job fairs, oral presentations, poster presentations, and conference networking events. The conference was held internationally for the first time in 1999 when it was hosted in Vancouver, BC. The annual conference is often discussed in the journal Applied Spectroscopy, Spectroscopy Magazine, and American Pharmaceutical Reviews.

At the 2011 FACSS Conference in Reno, NV, the FACSS organization changed the name of the annual conference to SciX. The first SciX Conference presented by FACSS was held in Kansas City, MO in 2012. The name change was discussed in Spectroscopy in fall 2011: . More information about the new name can be found at scixconference.org

== Awards ==
FACSS presents several awards to both students and professionals. These awards honor scientists who have made significant contributions to the field of Analytical Chemistry.

- FACSS Student Award and Tomas A. Hirshfeld Award [3]
- SAS Student Poster Awards and FACSS Student Poster Awards [4]
- FACSS Distinguished Service Award [5]
- FACSS Innovation Award [6]
- Charles Mann Award for Applied Raman Spectroscopy [7]
- Anachem Award [8]
- Lester W. Strock Award [9]
- Applied Spectroscopy William F. Meggers Award [10]
- Ellis R. Lippincott Award [11]
- William G. Fateley Student Award
- Coblentz Society Craver Award [12]
- ACS Div of Analytical Chem Arthur F. Findeis Award for Achievements by a Young Analytical Scientist [13]

The FACSS Innovation Award was started in 2011 at the Reno meeting.

== Sponsoring societies ==
- American Chemical Society Analytical Division
- AES Electrophoresis Society
- American Society for Mass Spectrometry
- Anachem
- Coblentz Society
- Council for Near-Infrared Spectroscopy
- Infrared Raman and Discussion Group
- International Society of Automation Analysis Division
- The North American Society for Laser-Induced Breakdown Spectroscopy
- Royal Society of Chemistry Analytical Division
- Society for Applied Spectroscopy
- The Spectroscopical Society of Japan

== Conferences ==
- 2015 (forthcoming) Providence, RI, September 27-October 2, 2015
- 2014 (forthcoming) Reno, NV, September 28-October 3, 2014
- 2013 (forthcoming) Milwaukee, WI, September 29-October 3, 2013, which will be the 40th annual meeting of the FACSS organization
- 2012 - Kansas City, MO
- 2011 - Reno, NV
- 2010 - Raleigh, NC
- 2009 - Louisville, KY
- 2008 - Reno, NV
- 2007 - Memphis, TN
- 2006 - Lake Buena Vista, FL
- 2005 - Quebec City, Canada
- 2004 - Portland, OR
- 2003 - Ft. Lauderdale, FL
- 2002 - Providence, RI
- 2001 - Detroit, Michigan
- 2000 - Nashville, Tennessee
- 1999 - Vancouver, BC
- 1998 - Austin, TX

Accompanying each conference, attendees receive a final program book of abstracts which includes the schedule of talks, profiles of award winners, a list of exhibitors, and much more. Copies of these final programs for all forty of the conferences held by FACSS are available for download as .pdf files from the FACSS website, under Past Events.
