= SIMCA (disambiguation) =

Simca (Société Industrielle de Mécanique et de Carrosserie Automobile) is a French automobile manufacturer.

SIMCA or Simca may also refer to:

- Soft independent modelling of class analogies, a statistical method
- Sugud Islands Marine Conservation Area, a Category II Marine Protected Area in Labuk-Sugud District, Malaysia
- Simone Beck, French cookbook author and cooking teacher nicknamed Simca
- Simca, a fictional character in the anime/manga series Air Gear

== See also ==
- Filip Šimka, Slovak ice hockey player
