= Chemometrics and Intelligent Laboratory Systems =

- Discipline: Chemometrics
- Language: English
- Edited by: R. Tauler

Publication details
- History: 1986-present
- Publisher: Elsevier
- Frequency: 10/year
- Impact factor: 3.491 (2020)

Standard abbreviations
- ISO 4: Chemom. Intell. Lab. Syst.

Indexing
- ISSN: 0169-7439
- OCLC no.: 13352494

Links
- Journal homepage; Online access

Chemometrics and Intelligent Laboratory Systems is a peer-reviewed scientific journal sponsored by the Chemometrics Society and published since 1986 by Elsevier. The current editor-in-chief is R. Tauler (Barcelona, Spain).

== Abstracting and indexing ==
The journal is abstracted and indexed in Analytical Abstracts, Cambridge Scientific Abstracts, Chemical Abstracts, Current Contents, Current Index to Statistics, EMBASE, Inspec, PubMed, Science Citation Index, and Scopus. According to the Journal Citation Reports, the journal's 2020 impact factor is 3.491. In 2016 the journal's ranking was 15th out of 58 journals in the category "Automation & Control Systems", 29th out of 74 in the category "Chemistry, Analytical", 26th out of 123 in the category "Computer Science, Artificial Intelligence", 9th out of 56 in the category "Instruments & Instrumentation", 12th out of 99 in the category "Mathematics, Interdisciplinary Applications" and 8th out of 122 journals in the category "Statistics & Probability".

== Most cited articles ==
According to the Web of Science, the following three articles have been cited most often (>600 times):

1. Wold, S. (1987). "Principal component analysis". Chemometrics and Intelligent Laboratory Systems. 2 (1–3): 37–52. doi:10.1016/0169-7439(87)80084-9. S2CID 54979942.
2. Wold, S. (2001). "PLS-regression: a basic tool of chemometrics". Chemometrics and Intelligent Laboratory Systems. 58 (2): 109–622. doi:10.1016/S0169-7439(01)00155-1. S2CID 11920190.
3. Bro, R. (1997). "PARAFAC. Tutorial and applications". Chemometrics and Intelligent Laboratory Systems. 38 (2): 149–201. doi:10.1016/S0169-7439(97)00032-4.
