= Sensometrics =

Scientific discipline applying scientific methods to Sensory and Consumer Science

Sensometrics is a scientific discipline that involves the application of mathematical, statistical, and computational methods to the field of Sensory and Consumer Science. It is an interdisciplinary field, closely related to disciplines such as sensory evaluation, statistics, psychometrics, and chemometrics, among others. Sensometrics deals with all aspects of data generation and analysis, from design of experiments and methods used to investigate perceptions and preferences, to specific tools to analyze and model the data resulting from these methods. Sensometrics plays a key role in Sensory and Consumer Science, providing important tools with applications in product development, quality assurance, market research, and consumer behavior.

== History ==
Sensometrics emerged in response to the increasing attention on measurement in the more general field of Sensory Science—which is typically described as concerned with “evoking, measuring, analyzing, and interpreting” humans’ sensory perceptions of consumer products. The exchange of knowledge between statisticians and sensory scientists contributed to the growth of both fields, by encouraging the development of new data collection methods as well as extending and inspiring the development of statistical techniques In 1992 a group of statisticians and sensory scientists started organizing Sensometrics meetings and the Sensometrics Society was created. Whereas the broader field of Sensory Science focuses on all of the above aspects, Sensometrics is particularly concerned with the development of methodologies for measuring and analyzing sensory experiences quantitatively.

== See also ==
- Sensory evaluation
- European Sensory Network
- Food Quality and Preference
- Journal of Sensory Studies
- Food science
