= Columbia Senior Executive Program =

The Columbia Senior Executive Program (CSEP) is awarded by Columbia Business School to students who complete a total of 26 consecutive program days of a specialized executive education course. Over the length of the program, CSEP provides multiple sessions covering strategy, leadership, functional excellence and details of global business issues. Participants explore business cases, as well as crucial issues and perspectives through faculty interaction, individual coaching and collaboration with a selective group of peers. The admission to CSEP and other advanced management programs for elite business schools is highly selective. In general, advanced management programs similar to CSEP limit class size to less than 50 students and schedule programs once or twice per year. Most often executives who attend are sent to the program by management or company boards because they are being groomed for a promotion or new position, many times to the C suite.

Recipients of the CSEP designation are granted select alumni status with Columbia Business School, including the following alumni benefits:

- Invitations to Columbia Business School alumni events and programs around the world
- Lifetime Columbia Business School e-mail address
- Subscriptions to all Columbia Business School and Columbia University alumni publications
- Eligibility to join a Columbia Business School alumni club
- Eligibility to join The Columbia University Club of New York
