= Svante Wold =

Swedish chemist (1941–2022)

Svante Bjarne Wold (14 March 1941 – 4 January 2022) was a Norwegian-born chemist and applied statistician who developed the field of "chemometrics", coining the word in 1971. He was the son of the statistician Hermann Wold.

Wold was born in Stockholm, the son of statistician Hermann and his wife Anna-Lisa Arrhenius, daughter of the physicist Svante Arrhenius. After military training, he joined the University of Uppsala, and then Umeå University where he received a doctorate in chemistry. He joined the department of organic chemistry, later becoming a professor. In 1971, he coined the term kemometri which was translated into English as "chemometrics" and founded the International Chemometrics Society along with Bruce Kowalski. In later years he would joke that chemometricians were people who drank beer and stole ideas from statisticians. His postdoctoral work was at the University of Wisconsin, Madison. He founded the multivariate statistical software company Umetrics along with his wife Nouna Kettaneh. He was involved in the development of the multivariate classification method known as Soft Independent Modelling of Class Analogy and the software called SIMCA.
