= ASTM International Award of Merit =

The ASTM International Award of Merit is an award that was established in the industrial era following World War II as a response to the growing need to recognize outstanding contributions to the leadership and authorship of consensus standards for manufacturing specifications and analysis. The Award, established in 1949 by the ASTM International Board of Directors, is the highest society award granted to an individual ASTM member. It is given for distinguished service and outstanding leadership participation in consensus standards activities sponsored by ASTM International committees. Recipients of the Award of Merit also receive the honorary title of Fellow of ASTM International (FASTM).

The ASTM International Award of Merit is presented at various technical conferences throughout the United States and is given on the basis of merit. The various ASTM Committees do not award this every year and some committees average one award every 4–5 years.

== See also ==
- List of engineering awards
