= Coblentz Society =

The Coblentz Society is a non-profit scientific organization named after William Weber Coblentz which is involved in fostering the understanding and application of vibrational spectroscopy. The Society provides education, awards and recognitions enhancing the understanding of molecular (vibrational) spectroscopy. The organization was founded in 1954 and is incorporated in the state of Connecticut. Originally considered to be the Infrared Society at its founding, the Coblentz Society has expanded its technical reach into Raman spectroscopy as the technique has become more accessible to both researchers and more casual users. The Society is the oldest organization in the United States specifically dedicated to the profession and activities associated with vibrational spectroscopy. The Coblentz Society is also the infrared and Raman technical affiliate of the Society for Applied Spectroscopy.

The Awards sponsored by The Coblentz Society include:

- The Coblentz Award is to recognize the contributions by a young professional spectroscopist to the fundamental understanding of vibrational spectroscopy
- The Craver Award is to recognize the efforts of young professional spectroscopists in the field of applied analytical spectroscopy
- The Williams–Wright Award is unique in that it recognizes the lifetime accomplishments of an industrial spectroscopist
- The Bomem-Michelson Award is currently inactive but was designed to recognize advancements in the field of vibrational spectroscopy
- The Lippincott Award for the advancement of spectroscopy from an optical perspective (co-sponsored by Optica and the Society for Applied Spectroscopy).

== Past presidents ==
- Nelson Fuson (1966–1968)
- Foil A. Miller (1959–1960)
