= Spectroscopy (magazine) =

American journal founded in 1985

- Editor: David Walsh
- Categories: Spectroscopy
- Frequency: Monthly
- Publisher: MJH Associates
- Founded: 1985
- Country: United States
- Based in: Iselin, New Jersey
- Language: English
- Website: www.spectroscopyonline.com
- ISSN: 0887-6703

Spectroscopy is a trade magazine published since 1985. Spectroscopy has an editorial goal to promote and support the use of spectroscopic instrumentation in applied research, environmental testing, quality control, and the life sciences.

Spectroscopy covers many techniques from analytical chemistry to include: atomic absorption and emission (including plasma-based methods such as ICP and ICP-MS); ultraviolet spectroscopy, visible spectroscopy; infrared spectroscopy (including FT-IR and Near-infrared spectroscopy; fluorescence, phosphorescence, and luminescence; Raman spectroscopy and FT-Raman; X-ray (XRF, XRD, and microanalysis); mass spectrometry; magnetic resonance (NMR, EPR, MRI); surface analysis (ESCA, SIMS, Auger); and laser-based spectroscopic techniques.
