= Journal of Chemometrics =

- Discipline: Chemistry
- Language: English
- Edited by: Cyril Ruckebusch

Publication details
- History: 1987-present
- Publisher: John Wiley & Sons
- Frequency: Monthly
- Impact factor: 2.467 (2020)

Standard abbreviations
- ISO 4: J. Chemom.

Indexing
- CODEN: JOCHEU
- ISSN: 0886-9383 (print); 1099-128X (web)
- LCCN: 87655700
- OCLC no.: 637417052

Links
- Journal homepage

The Journal of Chemometrics is a monthly peer-reviewed scientific journal published since 1987 by John Wiley & Sons. It publishes original scientific papers, reviews, and short communications on fundamental and applied aspects of chemometrics. The current editor-in-chief is Cyril Ruckebusch (University of Lille).

== Abstracting and indexing ==
Journal of Chemometrics is abstracted and indexed in:

- Chemical Abstracts Service
- Scopus
- Web of Science

According to the Journal Citation Reports, the journal has a 2020 impact factor of 2.467, ranking it 27th out of 64 journals in the category "Instruments & Instrumentation", 35th out of 63 journals in the category "Automation & Control Systems", 30th out of 125 journals in the category "Statistics & Probability", 40th out of 108 journals in the category "Mathematics Interdisciplinary Applications", and 54th out of 87 journals in the category "Chemistry Analytical",

== Highest cited papers ==
1. Selectivity, local rank, three-way data analysis and ambiguity in multivariate curve resolution, Volume 9, Issue 1, Jan-Feb 1995, Pages: 31–58, Tauler R, Smilde A, Kowalski B. Cited 370 times.
2. Genetic algorithms as a strategy for feature-selection, Volume 6, Issue 5, Sep-Oct 1992, Pages: 267–281, Leardi R, Boggia R, Terrile M. Cited 296 times.
3. Multiway calibration. Multilinear PLS, Volume 10, Issue 1, Jan-Feb 1996, Pages: 47–61, Bro R. Cited 290 times.
