= Society for Applied Spectroscopy =

Society for Applied Spectroscopy

The Society for Applied Spectroscopy (SAS) is an organization promoting research and education in the fields of spectroscopy, optics, and analytical chemistry. Founded in 1958, it is currently headquartered in Albany, New York. In 2006 it had about 2,000 members worldwide.

SAS is perhaps best known for its technical conference with the Federation of Analytical Chemistry and Spectroscopy Societies and short courses on various aspects of spectroscopy and data analysis. The society publishes the scientific journal Applied Spectroscopy.

SAS is affiliated with American Institute of Physics (AIP), the Coblentz Society, the Council for Near Infrared Spectroscopy (CNIRS), Federation of Analytical Chemistry and Spectroscopy Societies (FACSS), The Instrumentation, Systems, and Automation Society (ISA), and Optica.

SAS provides a number of awards with honoraria to encourage and recognize outstanding achievements.

== See also ==
- Spectroscopy
- American Institute of Physics (AIP)
- The Instrumentation, Systems, and Automation Society (ISA)
- Optical Society of America (OSA)
