= Paul Bohn =

American chemist

Paul W. Bohn
- Born: 1955 (age 70–71); Kentucky
- Education: University of Notre Dame; University of Wisconsin–Madison
- Partner: Raylene Bohn
- Children: 2
- Scientific career
- Workplaces: Bell Labs; University of Illinois at Urbana–Champaign; University of Notre Dame

Paul William Bohn (born 1955) is an American chemist who researches molecular nanotechnology. He is a fellow of the American Association for the Advancement of Science, Royal Society of Chemistry, and Society for Applied Spectroscopy, as well as a co-editor of the Annual Review of Analytical Chemistry.

== Early life and education ==
Paul William Bohn was born in 1955 in Kentucky to parents Catherine née Nally and Joseph Robert Bohn. He grew up with one brother. He attended the University of Notre Dame, graduating in 1977 with a bachelor's degree in chemistry. He then attended the University of Wisconsin–Madison for a PhD in chemistry, graduating in 1981.

== Career ==
Bohn's PhD training focused on the analytical chemistry of resist materials for x-ray lithography. His research primarily addresses molecular nanotechnology, particularly nanofluidics, combined electrochemistry and fluorescence spectroscopy of low-volume samples, nanophotonic/nanoelectronic devices, such as the electrochemical zero-mode waveguide, and multimodal chemical imaging of microbial communities. After finishing his PhD, Bohn worked at Bell Labs in Murray Hill, New Jersey in the Special Materials Group from 1981 to 1983. In 1983, he accepted a faculty position as an assistant professor at University of Illinois at Urbana–Champaign; in 1989 he was promoted to associate professor, and in 1992 he became a full professor. He was head of its chemistry department from 1994 to 1999. In 2001 and 2002 he was the Interim Vice Chancellor for Research. He was the Centennial Professor of the Chemical Sciences from 2003 to 2006, at which point he joined the University of Notre Dame as the Arthur J. Schmitt Professor. Together with Xiuling Li, he developed metal assisted chemical etching (MacEtch) for the preparation of high aspect-ratio solid state nanostructures. He also pioneered nanopore electrode arrays for single entity measurements as well as the electrochemical zero-mode waveguide. He previously served as Editor of Analyst and is currently co-editor of the Annual Review of Analytical Chemistry. He is the founding Director of the Berthiaume Institute for Precision Health, the Director of the Center for Bioanalytic Metrology – an NSF Industry-University Cooperative Research Center, and a founding member of the Indiana Consortium for Analytical Science and Engineering. He has also served as Program Chair, Chair, and Immediate Past Chair of the Analytical Division of the American Chemical Society.

== Awards and honors ==
He received the Coblentz Award in 1990 for his contributions to molecular spectroscopy, awarded to scientists younger than 36. He was also the recipient of the Pittsburgh Spectroscopy Society Award in 2004, the 2005 Bomem-Michelson Award from the Coblentz Society, the 2010 Theophilus Redwood Award from the Royal Society of Chemistry. He is the only person to have received the American Chemical Society Award in Spectrochemical Analysis (1997) and Electrochemistry (2017), and he is the recipient of the 2022 Charles N. Reilley Award of the Society for Electroanalytical Chemistry. He is an elected Fellow of the American Association for the Advancement of Science, Royal Society of Chemistry, and Society for Applied Spectroscopy. He was named one of the world's 20 Most Influential Analytical Scientists in 2019 by The Analytical Scientist.

== Personal life ==
He is married to Raylene Bohn and has two children.
