= Antje Baeumner =

German chemist

- Education: Technical University of Braunschweig; University of Stuttgart
- Scientific career
- Workplaces: Cornell University; University of Regensburg

Antje Baeumner is a German chemist who is Professor and Director of the Institute of Analytical Chemistry, Chemo- and Biosensors at the University of Regensburg in Germany. Her research considers biosensors and lab-on-a-chip devices for the detection of pathogenic organisms.

== Early life and education ==
Baeumner was an undergraduate student at the Technical University of Braunschweig, where she studied biotechnology. She moved to the University of Stuttgart for graduate studies. In 1997 Baeumner moved to Cornell University as a postdoctoral fellow.

== Research and career ==
Baeumner joined the faculty at Cornell University in 1999, and was promoted to Professor in 2008. Her research considered biosensors for the detection of pathogenic organisms in food. Whilst at Cornell, she was awarded a Blavatnik Awards for Young Scientists. Baeumner was part of a Bill & Melinda Gates Foundation program to create low-cost HIV/AIDS diagnostic tools for use in the developing world. Specifically, Baeumner looked to develop a simple, low-cost approach to evaluate CD4+ T cell count in the blood, a marker of HIV/AIDS infection. CD4 counts can advise when to start and stop taking antiretroviral drugs. She created a pregnancy test-like device that makes use of biosensor nanovesicles to amplify the signal.

In 2007, Baeumner was awarded fellowships from the German Research Foundation and Alexander von Humboldt Foundation. She moved to the Institute of Analytical Sciences in Dortmund, where she spent a year developing microfluidic devices and strategies to image cancer cells in vivo using nanovesicles. She moved to the Institute of Analytical Chemistry, Chemo- and Biosensors at the University of Regensburg in Germany in 2013, where she studies biosensors and micro-total analysis systems (μ TAS) for the detection of pathogens in food.

Baeumner has served as Editor-in-Chief of Analytical and Bioanalytical Chemistry since 2019. In 2026, Baeumner became a co-editor of the Annual Review of Analytical Chemistry. Baeumner serves as President of the International Association of Environmental Analytical Chemistry.

== Selected publications ==
- Peter J Asiello; Antje J Baeumner (2011). "Miniaturized isothermal nucleic acid amplification, a review". Lab on a Chip. 11 (8): 1420–1430. doi:10.1039/c0lc00666a. PMID 21387067. Wikidata Q37851033.
- Antje J Baeumner (2003). "Biosensors for environmental pollutants and food contaminants". Analytical and Bioanalytical Chemistry. 377 (3): 434–445. doi:10.1007/s00216-003-2158-9. PMID 12920503. Wikidata Q35200612.
- Nongnoot Wongkaew; Şimşek, Marcel; Christian Griesche; Antje J Baeumner (2018). "Functional Nanomaterials and Nanostructures Enhancing Electrochemical Biosensors and Lab-on-a-Chip Performances: Recent Progress, Applications, and Future Perspective". Chemical Reviews. 119 (1): 120–194. doi:10.1021/acs.chemrev.8b00172. PMID 30247026. Wikidata Q57151285.
