= Mark H. Schoenfisch =

American analytical chemist

- Born: Elgin, Illinois, U.S.
- Education: University of Kansas (B.A., 1992); University of Arizona (Ph.D., 1997)
- Scientific career
- Fields: Chemistry
- Workplaces: University of North Carolina at Chapel Hill
- Doctoral advisor: Jeanne E. Pemberton

Mark H. Schoenfisch (/ˈʃeɪnfɪʃ/ SHAYN-fish) is an American analytical chemist. He is the Peter A. Ornstein Distinguished Professor of Chemistry at the University of North Carolina at Chapel Hill and is jointly appointed with the institution's Schools of Medicine and Pharmacy. His research interests include analytical sensors, biomaterials, and the development of macromolecular nitric oxide release scaffolds as novel therapeutics. Intellectual property originating from his research group is the basis of technology being commercialized by Novan, Diabetic Health, and Vast Therapeutics located in the Research Triangle Park.

== Early life and education ==
Mark H. Schoenfisch was born in Elgin, Illinois. He attended William Fremd High School in Palatine, Illinois (class of 1988) and graduated from the University of Kansas in 1992 with a B.A. in Chemistry and Germanic Languages & Literature. Schoenfisch went on to receive his Ph.D. in Chemistry at the University of Arizona in 1997.

== Career ==
In 1998, Schoenfisch worked as a NIH Postdoctoral Fellow under the Department of Chemistry at the University of Michigan. He moved to Chapel Hill, North Carolina, and began his independent research career as an Assistant Professor of chemistry at the University of North Carolina at Chapel Hill in 2000. He was promoted to Associate Professor in 2005, and Full Professor in 2009. He was appointed as Peter A. Ornstein Distinguished Professor in 2018.

== Research ==
The Schoenfisch group works at the interface analytical chemistry, materials science, biomedical engineering, and pharmacology. Research within the Schoenfisch group is currently focused on four main areas:

1. Designing macromolecular nitric oxide release vehicles as novel therapeutics for treating disease
2. Improving the analytical performance of implantable continuous glucose monitoring devices for diabetes management
3. Designing microfluidic nitric oxide (NO) sensors for real-time detection of NO in biological media
4. Developing superhydrophobic interfaces for mold prevention and remediation

== Awards and honors ==
In 1998, Schoenfisch received the National Institutes of Health Postdoctoral Fellowship. He received the Society for Analytical Chemists of Pittsburgh Young Investigator Award in 2001, the Eli Lilly and Company Young Investigator Award in 2002, the National Science Foundation CAREER Award in 2004 and the International Union of Pure and Applied Chemistry Young Observer Award in 2005. Schoenfisch was recognized as a prominent professor in 2007 when he received the John L. Sanders Award for Distinguished Undergraduate Teaching and Service. In 2015, he received both the Chapman Family Teaching Award for Distinguished Teaching of Undergraduates as well as the Institute for the Arts and Humanities Faculty Fellowship. In 2018, he received UNC's Office of Commercialization and Economic Development Inventor of the Year Award.

== Commercialization interests ==
Schoenfisch is a cofounder of Novan, Inc. (2006). The public pharmaceutical company focuses primarily on the development of nitric oxide release-based therapies for dermatological indications. One lead product is an anti-acne drug, which has completed Phase 3 clinical trial. At least three other drugs are being developed, including topical anti-virals for the treatment of molluscum contagiosum (Phase 3) and external genital warts caused by the human papillomavirus (Phase 2), and a topical for the treatment of onychomycosis (Phase 2).

Schoenfisch is also a cofounder of KnowBIO, LLC and Vast Therapeutics, Inc., 2017. Vast focuses on the development of water-soluble nitric oxide-releasing biopolymers for treating chronic respiratory infections.
