= Nancy Allbritton =

American biologist

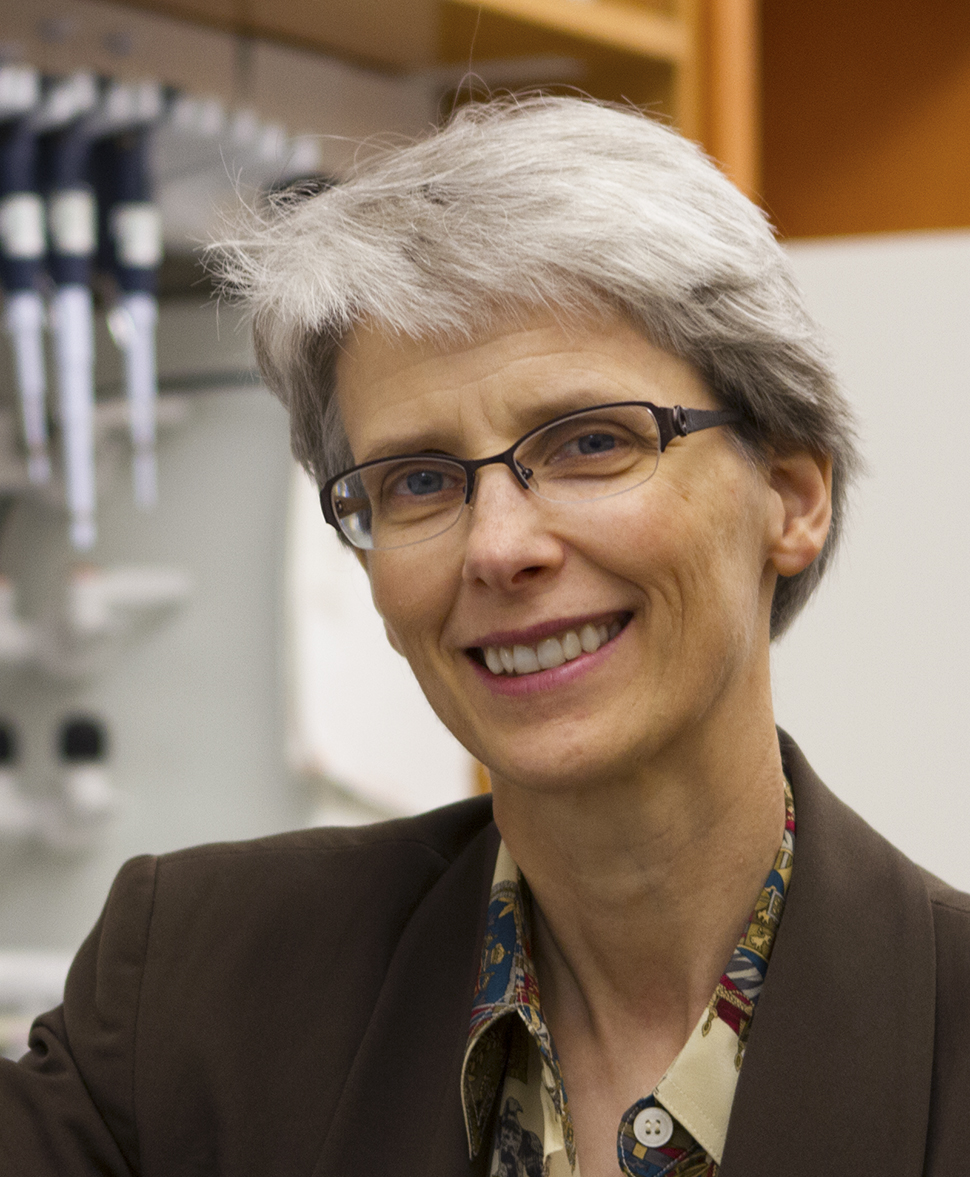
- Education: Louisiana State University (BS); Johns Hopkins University (MD); Massachusetts Institute of Technology (PhD)
- Known for: Single-cell analysis
- Scientific career
- Fields: Biomedical Engineering
- Workplaces: University of Washington University of North Carolina at Chapel Hill and North Carolina State University

Nancy L. Allbritton is a Professor of Bioengineering and the Frank & Julie Jungers Dean of the College of Engineering at the University of Washington. She was previously a Kenan Professor and Chair in the Joint Department of Biomedical Engineering at the University of North Carolina at Chapel Hill and North Carolina State University.

She is best known for her work in single-cell analysis. Using engineering methods, Allbritton creates tools for better understanding and manipulating living cells and tissues. Microengineered platforms, microfluidics, and novel biochemical assays enable scientists to study cell signaling and signal transduction at the single-cell level.

== Education ==
Allbritton received a bachelor of science with a major in physics from Louisiana State University in 1979. She received a doctor of medicine from Johns Hopkins University in 1985 and a doctor of philosophy in medical physics and medical engineering from the Massachusetts Institute of Technology in 1987.

== Career ==
Allbritton was a postdoctoral fellow at Stanford University from 1989 to 1994. She then became a Professor at the University of California, Irvine, teaching in the departments of Physiology and Biophysics, Biomedical Engineering, Chemistry, Chemical Engineering and Materials Science. She remained at UC Irvine for 13 years, from 1994-2007.

In 2007 Allbritton joined the University of North Carolina at Chapel Hill, becoming a Kenan Distinguished Professor. From 2009-2019 she was the Chair of the Joint Department of Biomedical Engineering at the University of North Carolina at Chapel Hill and North Carolina State University. She has held faculty appointments in Chemistry, Pharmacology and Applied Physical Sciences at UNC, and in the Department of Materials Science and Engineering at NC State.

As of November 1, 2019, Allbritton became a Professor of Bioengineering and the Frank & Julie Jungers Dean of Engineering at the University of Washington College of Engineering.

Allbritton was appointed a co-editor of the Annual Review of Analytical Chemistry in 2021.

== Research interests ==
Allbritton's interest in single-cell analysis have hinged on the use of capillary electrophoresis (CE) and microfabricated technologies. Through this work she has studied lipid signaling at the single-cell level, the isolation cytotoxic T-cells with specific properties, and the capture of colonic crypts. In the organ-on-a-chip field, Allbritton has used fabrication technologies from electronics and microfluidics to develop devices that effectively recreate the environment of both the small and large intestine. These include micro total analysis systems and microraft arrays. In the area of dielectrophoresis (DEP), Allbritton's lab works on the transfer of DEP-based systems out of laboratories and into clinical use.

== Awards ==
- 1982-1985: Health Sciences and Technology Fellowship, Massachusetts Institute of Technology
- 1995: Searle Scholar Award
- 1995: Beckman Young Investigator Award
- 2003-2004: Distinguished Mid-Career Faculty Award for Research, University of California, Irvine
- 2009: Mary K. and Velmer A. Fassel Award, Iowa State University
- 2015: NIH Director's Transformative Award, National Institutes of Health
- 2016: Award in Chemical Instrumentation, ACS Division of Analytical Chemistry
- 2017: Edward Kidder Graham Leadership Award, UNC
- 2017: Innovator of the Year, UNC-Chapel Hill
- 2020: Ralph N. Adams Award in Bioanalytical Chemistry, Pittcon
- 2021: Pritzker Distinguished Lecture Award, Biomedical Engineering Society

== Patents ==
- "Fast controllable laser lysis of cells for analysis" Nancy L. Allbritton, Christopher E. Sims, Michael W. Berns, Gavin D. Meredith, Tatiana B. Krasieva, Bruce J. Tromberg U.S. Patent No. US6156576A
- "Method and apparatus for detecting enzymatic activity using molecules that change electrophoretic mobility" Nancy L. Allbritton, Christopher E. Sims, Michael W. Berns, Gavin D. Meredith, Tatiana B. Krasieva, Bruce J. Tromberg U.S. Patent No. 6335201B1
- "Method to measure the activation state of signaling pathways in cells" Nancy Allbritton, Christopher Sims U.S. Patent No. 7236888B2
- "Chemical modifications to polymer surfaces and the application of polymer grafting to biomaterials" Nancy Allbritton, Christopher Sims, Guann-Pyng Li, Mark Bachman, Shuwen Hu, Xueqin Ren U.S. Patent No. 20050237480A1
- "Systems and methods for efficient collection of single cells and colonies of cells and fast generation of stable transfectants" Nancy Allbritton, Christopher E. Sims, Yuli Wang, Mark Bachman, Guann-Pyng Li, Eric Stanbridge U.S. Patent No. 7759119B2
- "Method and device for cell selection and collection in an isolated culturing environment" Nancy Allbritton, Christopher Sims, Wei Xu U.S. Patent No. 20110294208A1
- "Array of micromolded structures for sorting adherent cells" Nancy Allbritton, Christopher Sims, Yuli Wang, Pavak Kirit Shah U.S. Patent No. 9068155B2
