= Edward Yeung =

Chinese-American chemist

Edward S. Yeung
- Education: Cornell University (A.B.); University of California, Berkeley (Ph.D.) (both in Chemistry)
- Scientific career
- Workplaces: Iowa State University; Ames Laboratory
- Doctoral advisor: C. Bradley Moore
- Doctoral students: Robert Synovec

Edward S. Yeung is a Chinese-American chemist who studies spectroscopy and chromatography. Yeung is a Distinguished Professor Emeritus at Iowa State University. He was elected as a Fellow of the American Association for the Advancement of Science. He was a founding co-editor of the Annual Review of Analytical Chemistry from 2008 to 2014 and has served on the editorial committees of a number of other journals.

Yeung was the first person to quantitatively analyze the chemical contents of a single human red blood cell (erythrocyte). His research group has developed a method using capillary electrophoresis (CE) to identify the coenzymes NAD+ and NADH within a cell. Such developments could lead to improved detection of AIDS, cancer and genetic diseases such as Alzheimer's disease, muscular dystrophy, and Down syndrome. Yeung has won four R&D 100 Awards and an Editor's Choice award from R&D Magazine for this pioneering work. He is also the 2002 recipient of the American Chemical Society Award in Chromatography for his research in chemical separations.
