= Annual Review of Analytical Chemistry =

Peer-reviewed scientific journal

- Discipline: Analytical chemistry
- Language: English
- Edited by: Nancy L. Allbritton; Antje Baeumner

Publication details
- History: 2008–present, 18 years old
- Publisher: Annual Reviews (US)
- Frequency: Annually
- Open access: Subscribe to Open
- Impact factor: 8.3 (2025)

Standard abbreviations
- ISO 4: Annu. Rev. Anal. Chem.

Indexing
- CODEN: ARACFU
- ISSN: 1936-1327 (print); 1936-1335 (web)
- LCCN: 2007215104
- OCLC no.: 85479636

Links
- Journal homepage

The Annual Review of Analytical Chemistry is a peer-reviewed academic journal that publishes an annual volume of review articles relevant to analytical chemistry. It was established in 2008 and is published by Annual Reviews (AR). As of 2023, it is being published as open access, under the Subscribe to Open model.

== History ==
The Annual Review of Analytical Chemistry was first published in 2008 by Annual Reviews (AR), a nonprofit organization whose stated mission is to synthesize knowledge "for the progress of science and the benefit of society". The journal's founding editors were Edward S. Yeung and Richard N. Zare. Though it began with a physical edition, it is now only published electronically.

== Scope and indexing ==
The Annual Review of Analytical Chemistry defines its scope as covering significant developments in analytical chemistry, drawing from the related disciplines of biology, engineering, and physics. As of 2026, Journal Citation Reports lists the journal's impact factor as 8.3, ranking it seventh of 111 journals in the category "Chemistry, Analytical" and second of 44 in "Spectroscopy". It is abstracted and indexed in Scopus, Science Citation Index Expanded, EMBASE, MEDLINE, and Academic Search, among others.

== Editorial processes ==
The Annual Review of Analytical Chemistry is helmed by the editor or the co-editors. The editor is assisted by the editorial committee, which includes associate editors, regular members, and occasionally guest editors. Guest members participate at the invitation of the editor, and serve terms of one year. All other members of the editorial committee are appointed by the AR board of directors and serve five-year terms. The editorial committee determines which topics should be included in each volume and solicits reviews from qualified authors. Unsolicited manuscripts are not accepted. Peer review of accepted manuscripts is undertaken by the editorial committee.

=== Editors of volumes ===
Dates indicate publication years in which someone was credited as a lead editor or co-editor of a journal volume. The planning process for a volume begins well before the volume appears, so appointment to the position of lead editor generally occurred prior to the first year shown here. An editor who has retired or died may be credited as a lead editor of a volume that they helped to plan, even if it is published after their retirement or death.

- Edward S. Yeung and Richard N. Zare (2008–2012)
- Yeung and R. Graham Cooks (2013–2014)
- Cooks and Jeanne Pemberton (2015)
- Cooks, Pemberton and Paul Bohn (2016)
- Cooks and Pemberton (2017)
- Pemberton and Bohn (2018-2021)
- Bohn and Nancy L. Allbritton (2021-2026)
- Allbritton and Antje Baeumner (2026–present)

=== Current editorial board ===
As of 2026, the editorial committee consists of the two co-editors and the following committee members:

- Abraham Badu-Tawiah
- Susan M. Lunte

== See also ==
- Annual Review of Biochemistry
- Annual Review of Chemical and Biomolecular Engineering
- Annual Review of Physical Chemistry
