= Robert Synovec =

American chemist

- Born: Minnesota, United States
- Education: Bethel College; Iowa State
- Awards: Marcel E Golay Award; GC×GC Scientific Achievement Award
- Scientific career
- Fields: Chemistry, analytical chemistry, gas chromatography, liquid chromatography, and chemometrics
- Workplaces: University of Washington
- Doctoral advisor: Edward Yeung

Robert E Synovec (born 1959) is an American analytical chemist and professor of chemistry at the University of Washington where he specializes in multidimensional separations and chemometrics. Synovec has received several awards for his contributions to analytical chemistry and separation science, including the GC×GC Scientific Achievement Award and the Marcel E Golay Award, which is given for recognition of a lifetime of achievement in capillary chromatography.

== Education ==
Synovec was born in 1959 to Eugene "Gene" Synovec and Joan Synovec. Synovec graduated with a BS in chemistry from Bethel College in 1981. He obtained his PhD from Iowa State in 1986 working under Edward Yeung where he developed detection and data analysis methods for liquid chromatography. He started at the University of Washington in 1986.

== Research ==
Synovec's interests include both instrumentation and chemometrics, the science of using mathematical and statical tools to extract useful information from chemical data. His group were early adopters of comprehensive two-dimensional gas chromatography (GC×GC), a multidimensional separation technique. His group was the first to apply chemometric tools to GC×GC data, which had been largely used for spectroscopy up to that point. His group also introduced valve-based modulation techniques to GC×GC, which they have continued to develop, while early instruments used thermal modulation. Another focus of Synovec's lab is the development of comprehensive three-dimensional gas chromatography (GC^{3}), a 3D extension of GC×GC which employs three separation columns and two modulators. His research lab has commercialized chemometric software for analyzing GC×GC data. He has been affiliated with the Center for Process Analysis and Control (formerly the Center for Process Analytical Chemistry).

Synovec has graduated some 40 PhD students in addition to numerous Master's students and undergraduates. As of 2023 his publication record includes nearly 300 journal articles, with an h-index estimated to be in the 50s.
