= Yavapai College =

Community college in Yavapai County, Arizona, US

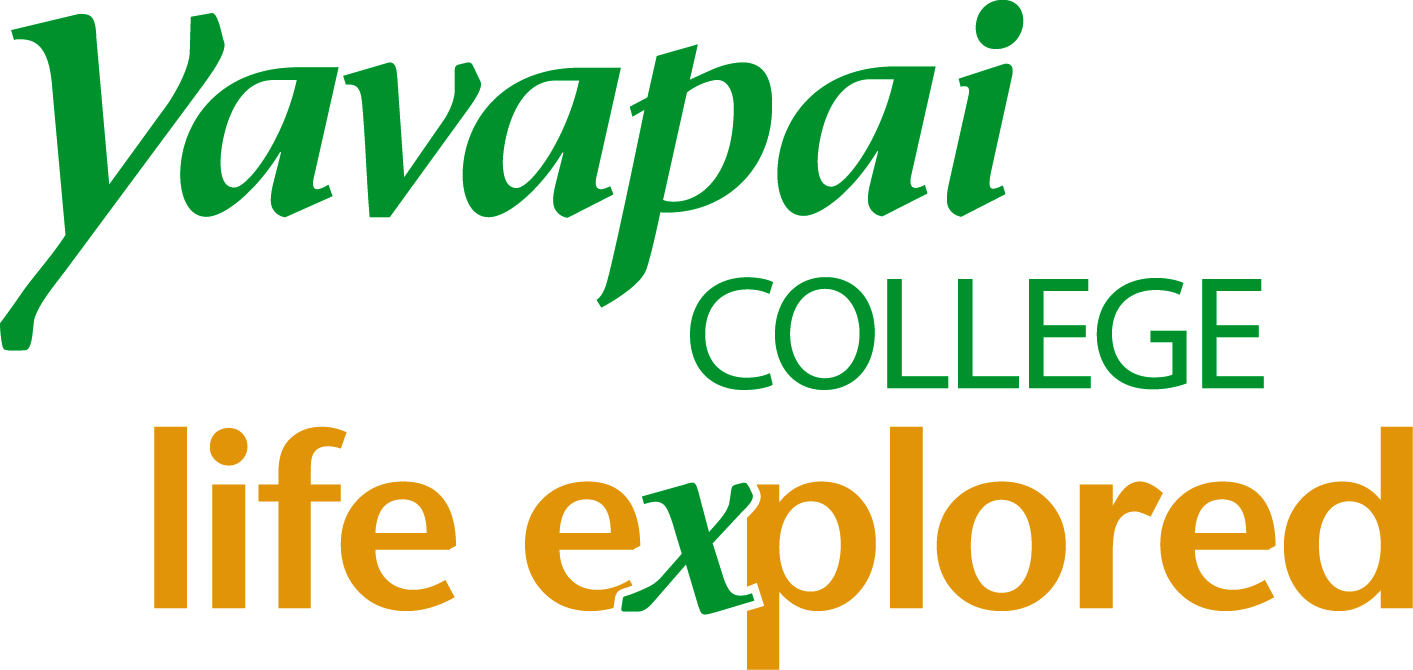
- Motto: You Can!
- Type: Public community college
- Established: 1965; 61 years ago
- Endowment: $22.8 million (2024)
- President: Lisa Rhine
- Faculty: 114 (full time), 300 (adjunct)
- Students: 11,616 (fall 2013)
- Location: Prescott, Arizona, United States; 34.547652°N 112.453650°W
- Campus: Rural
- Colors: Green and gold
- Nickname: Roughriders
- Sporting affiliations: NJCAA – ACCAC
- Mascot: 'Ole Ruff
- Website: www.yc.edu

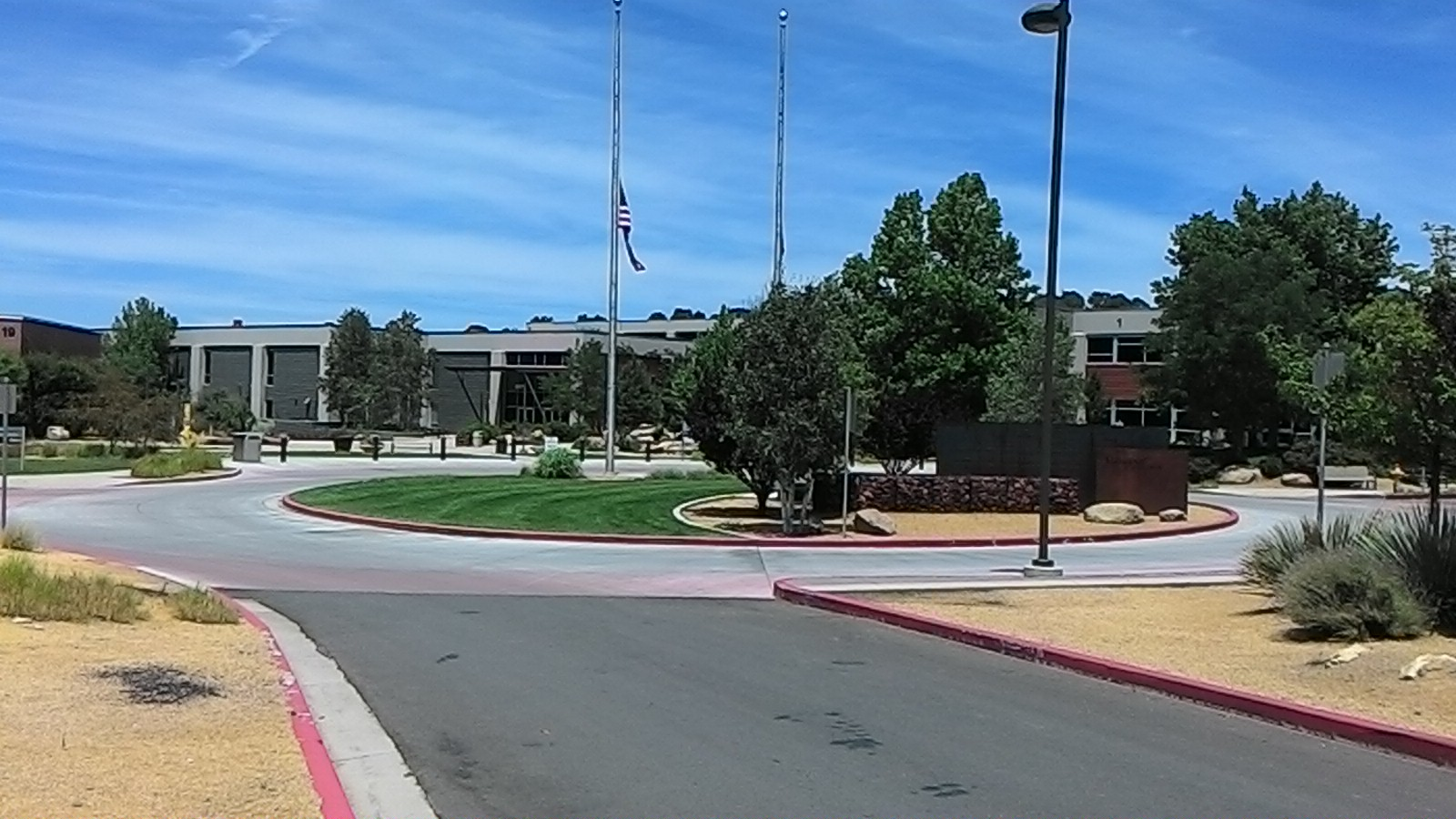
Yavapai College main entrance

Yavapai College is a public community college in Yavapai County, Arizona. The main campus is in Prescott, with locations in Clarkdale, Prescott Valley, Chino Valley and Sedona.

== History ==
Yavapai College was established in 1965 by means of a countywide election. In the four years that followed, a board was appointed, a bond was passed, college personnel were hired, and curricula were established. The first classes were held in fall 1969. In February 1970, the college district dedicated its first buildings in Prescott on a 100-acre (0.40 km^{2}) site that was once part of Fort Whipple, the military base constructed in 1864 to provide security and protection for the territorial capital.

== Campus ==
Yavapai College offers on-campus housing at the Prescott Campus in the two residence halls: Marapai and Kachina. The Rider Diner offers several cafeteria style meals seven days a week. There is a self-serve cafe in the library of the Prescott campus that offers light meals and snacks. Yavapai College operates year-round 24-hour police services.

On October 3, 2012, the Yavapai College District Governing Board approved a motion to support reinvestment in on-campus housing, allotting $5.2 million for the proposed renovation project.

== Academics ==
In 2010–11, the college offered 99 certificate, degree and transfer options to students in 73 different programs of study. In addition to traditional curricula, the college offers many learning options to fit the lifestyles and circumstances of its students. Alternative learning options include credit for prior learning, internships/service learning, non-credit courses, college for children, high school partnerships (dual enrollment), internet courses, open entry/open exit courses, telecourses, senior programs (OLLI, Elderhostel/Edventures) and high school equivalency program (GED testing).

The college offers seven Associate degree programs: Associate of Arts/Associate of Science, Associate of Business Degrees, Associate of Arts in Elementary Education, Associate of Fine Arts Degree, Associate of General Studies Degree Program, Associate Degree in Nursing and Associate of Applied Science Degree.

The college is the location of the Yavapai College Gunsmithing School, which for several years was renowned as one of the top three gunsmithing schools in the U.S. with Trinidad State Jr College and Colorado School of Trades.

== Student life ==
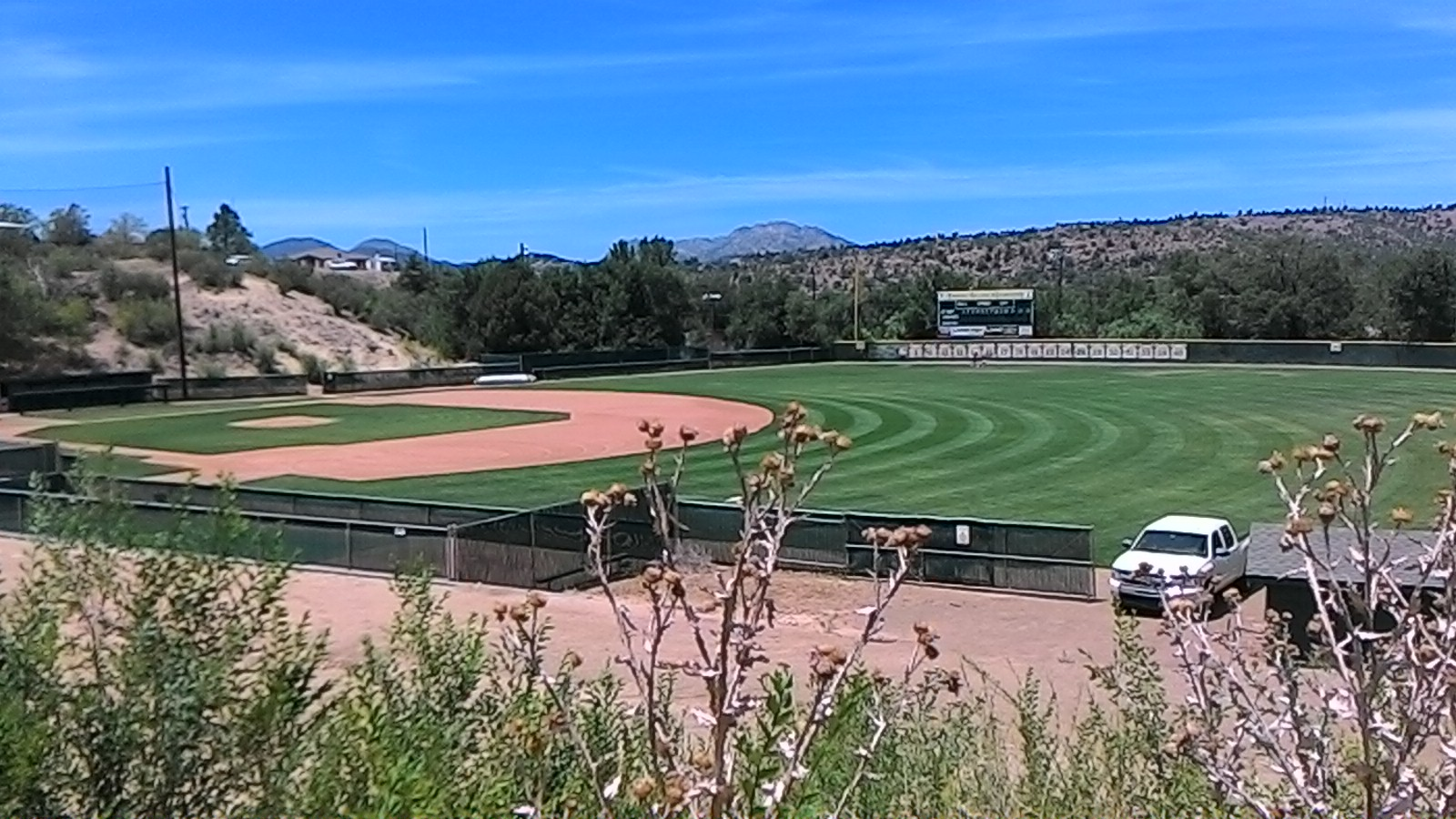
Yavapai College ball field

Yavapai College currently sponsors four intercollegiate teams - two men (soccer, baseball) and two women (volleyball, softball) - and competes in Division 1 of the National Junior College Athletics Association (NJCAA). The college belongs to the Arizona Community College Athletics Conference (ACCAC), a league of fifteen community colleges in Arizona.

Men's and women's basketball programs were sponsored until 2011, when they were eliminated due to Arizona state budget cuts.

The college athletic teams have distinguished themselves athletically with national championships in soccer (7), baseball (4), softball (2) and cross country (2).

In spring 2014, in joint efforts between students and the athletic department, Yavapai College began streaming and broadcasting sporting events online via its Ustream.tv account.

== Notable people ==
=== Government ===
- Ken Bennett, former Arizona Secretary of State

=== Sports ===
- Kyle Blanks, professional baseball player
- Kole Calhoun, professional baseball player
- Willie Calhoun, professional baseball player
- Gabriel Claudio, professional soccer player
- Chad Curtis, professional baseball player
- Christian Encarnacion-Strand, professional baseball player
- Roger Espinoza, professional soccer player
- Ken Giles, professional baseball player
- Alan Gordon, professional soccer player
- Billy Hatcher, professional baseball player and coach
- Kelvin Jack, professional soccer player
- Avery John, professional soccer player
- Merrill Kelly, professional baseball player
- Jesse Maldonado, professional soccer player
- Justin Meram, professional soccer player
- Eric Prindle, mixed martial arts fighter
- Mike Randolph, professional soccer player
- Jennifer Sadler, volleyball player
- John Scearce, professional soccer player
- Curt Schilling, professional baseball player
- Kirby Yates, professional baseball player

=== Arts ===
- Brian Stauffer, award-winning illustrator

=== Science ===
- Jani Ingram, chemistry professor

== Gallery ==
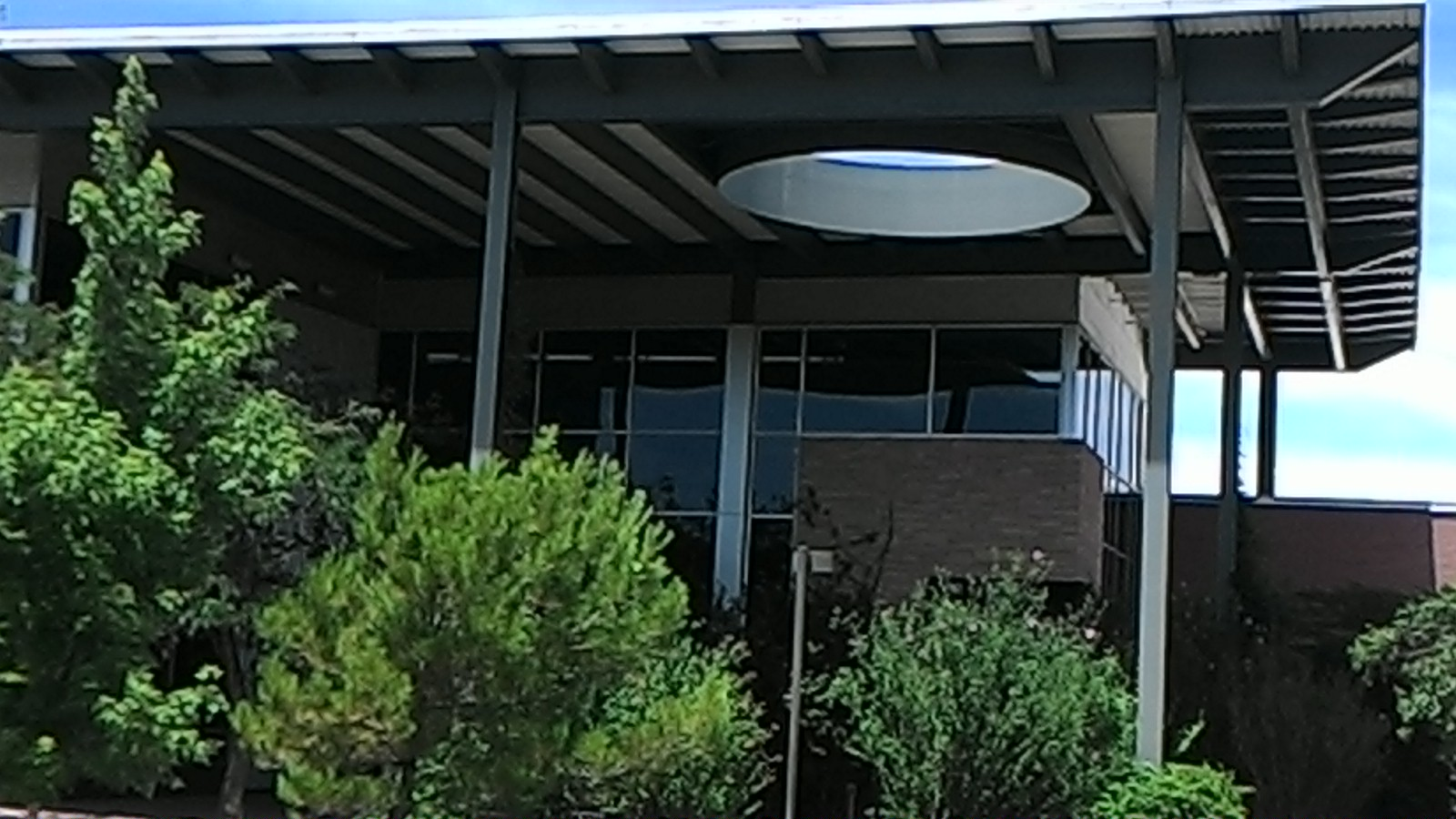
College Library

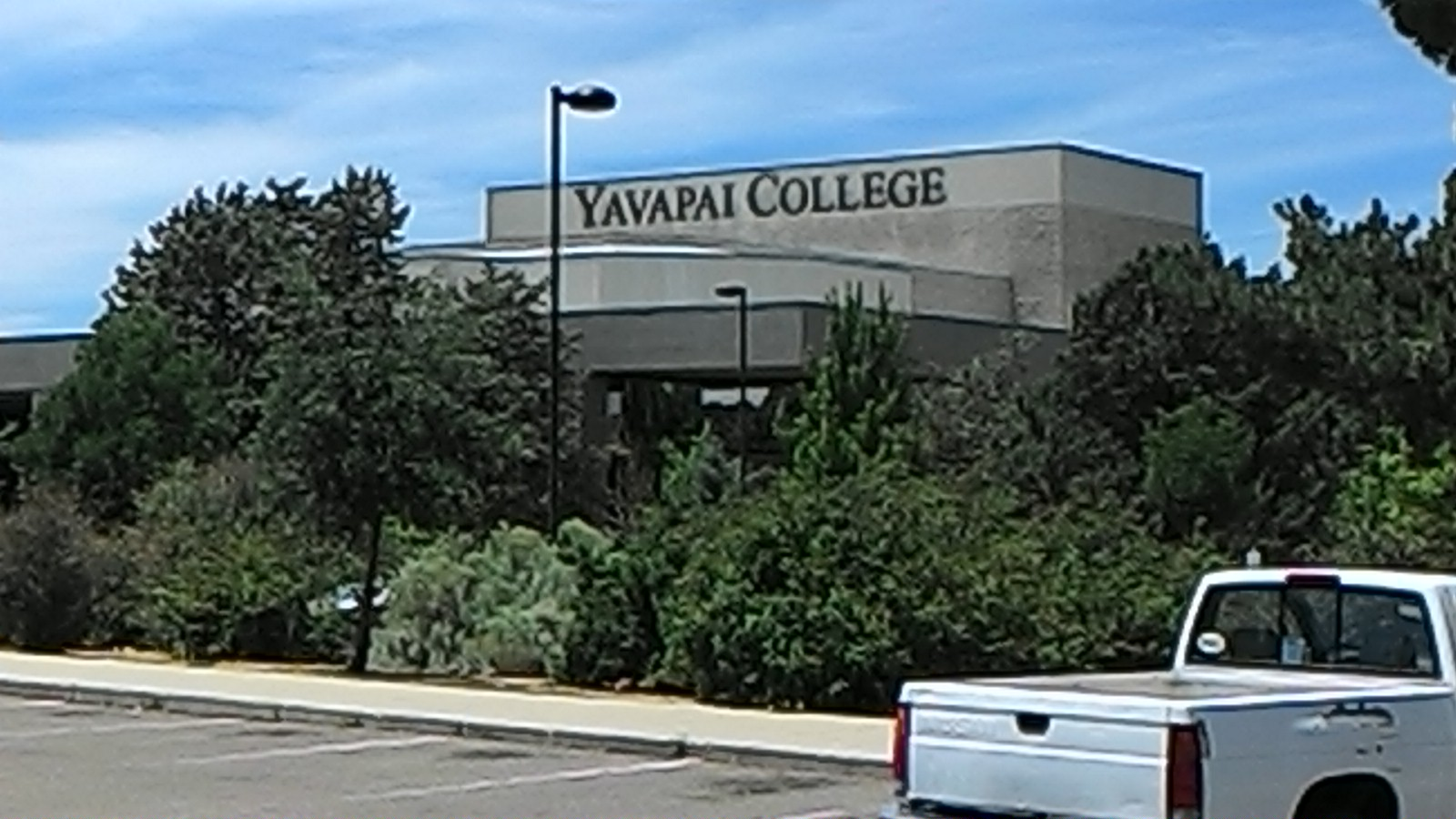
Performing Arts Building
