= Jani Ingram =

American chemist

Jani C. Ingram
- Citizenship: Navajo (Diné)
- Education: Yavapai Community College (A.A.), New Mexico State University (B.S.), University of Arizona (Ph.D.)
- Scientific career
- Fields: Analytical chemistry, Environmental chemistry
- Workplaces: Northern Arizona University
- Thesis: Surface-enhanced Raman scattering and electron spectroscopic studies of copper and silver surfaces (1990)
- Doctoral advisor: Jeanne Pemberton
- Website: https://directory.nau.edu/person/jci5

Jani Ingram is a professor of chemistry and biochemistry at Northern Arizona University. Ingram researches the chemistry and health impacts of environmental pollutants, especially uranium and arsenic. Ingram is a member of the Navajo tribe, and the Naneesht’ezhi clan. She leads the Bridging Arizona Native American Students to Bachelor's Degrees (NIH Bridges to Baccalaureate) program and the Native American Cancer Prevention Program. She promotes educational and professional opportunities for Native American students in chemistry through a number of initiatives and for this work was awarded the 2018 American Chemical Society Award for Encouraging Disadvantaged Students into Careers in the Chemical Sciences.

== Education ==
Ingram began her academic studies at Yavapai Community College in Arizona where she earned an associate's degree. She subsequently studied at New Mexico State University and earned a bachelor's degree in chemistry. Her Ph.D. is in chemistry from the University of Arizona.

== Career and research ==
Ingram's research areas are analytical chemistry and environmental chemistry. She specializes on environmental uranium and arsenic contamination and how they effect the food chain and water supplies of the Navajo nation. She also researches traditional Navajo food ingredients and their health benefits, for example juniper ash as a calcium source. In light of the COVID-19 pandemic, her research laboratory repurposed their facilities to produce hand sanitizer which was donated to the Navajo Nation.
