= Xiuling Li =

Electrical and Computer Engineer

- Born: 1964 (age 61–62)
- Awards: Fellow, National Academy of Inventors (2021); Optical Society of America (OSA) Fellow (2019); American Physical Society (APS) Fellow (2018); IEEE Fellow (2017); Faculty Entrepreneurial Fellow, Inaugural, College of Engineering (2015); Willett Faculty Scholar, COE, UIUC (2015)

Academic background
- Education: BS, Physical Chemistry, 1986, Peking University; MS, 1993, Ph.D. Chemistry, 1994, University of California, Los Angeles
- Thesis: (1993)

Academic work
- Institutions: University of Texas at Austin; University of Illinois at Urbana-Champaign
- Website: sites.utexas.edu/xiulingli/

Xiuling Li is a distinguished electrical and computer engineering professor in the field of nanostructured semiconductor devices. She is currently the Temple Foundation Endowed Professorship No. 3 in Electrical and Computer Engineering and Fellow of the Dow Professor in Chemistry at the University of Texas at Austin. Previously, she was a Donald Biggar Willet Professor in Electrical and Computer Engineering and Interim Director of the Nick Holonyak Jr. Micro and Nanotechnology Laboratory at the University of Illinois at Urbana-Champaign.

== Education ==
Li attended Peking University and graduated with her B.S in Physical Chemistry in 1986. She attended the University of California, Los Angeles from 1989 to 1993, where she completed her PhD research under the supervision of Nathan S. Lewis.

== Career ==
After completing her PhD, Li worked as a postdoctoral research associate at California Institute of Technology from 1994 to 1998 under the supervision of Nathan S. Lewis. In 1994, she began a postdoctoral research position at the University of Illinois at Urbana-Champaign under the supervision of James S. Coleman of the Semiconductor Laser Laboratory at the Nick Holonyak Jr. Micro and Nanotechnology Laboratory. At the time, she was the only female engineer working in the MNTL cleanrooms.

Li was promoted to research assistant professor at UIUC in 1998, where she remained until 2001.

=== EpiWorks Inc. ===
In 2001, Li left the university to work as senior engineer at EpiWorks, a semiconductor manufacturing startup in Champaign-Urbana that focuses on developing novel high-performance III-V epitaxial semiconductor materials and devices. In 2003 she was promoted to R&D Manager, where she remained until 2007.

=== University of Illinois ===
Li returned to the University of Illinois faculty in 2007 with dual appointments as a faculty affiliate in the Department of Materials Science and Engineering and assistant professor in electrical and computer engineering. In 2015, she was promoted to full professor and Willet Faculty Scholar; in 2020 she was named the Donald Bigger Willet Professor in Engineering. During her time at UIUC, she was the recipient of numerous faculty and research honors, including Fellow, National Academy of Inventors (2021), Fellow, Big Ten Academic Alliance (BTAA) Academic Leadership Program (2020), fellow, Optical Society of America (2019), fellow, American Physical Society (2018), fellow, IEEE (2017), deputy editor, Applied Physics Letters (2015- ), board of governors, IEEE Photonics Society (2014–2016), Faculty Entrepreneurial Fellow, Inaugural, College of Engineering, UIUC (2015-2016), Campus Excellent Teacher ranked by students, UIUC (2015, 2020), A. T. Yang Research Award, ECE, UIUC (2013), Dean's Award for Excellence in Research, College of Engineering, UIUC (2012), ONR Young Investigator Program Award (2011, 2014), DARPA Young Faculty Award (2009-2011), and NSF Career Award (2008-2013).

=== University of Texas at Austin ===
In 2021, Li left the University of Illinois and joined the faculty at the University of Texas at Austin with dual appointments as Temple Foundation Endowed Professor #3 in Electrical and Computer Engineering and Fellow of the Dow Professorship in Chemistry.

== Research ==
Li's research focuses on novel fabrication and processing for nanostructured semiconductor materials and devices. Some of her notable research innovations include metal assisted chemical etching (MacEtch) and Strain-Induced Self-rolled-up Membranes (S-RuM), in addition to novel techniques in epitaxial growth and metalorganic chemical vapor deposition of III-N materials. Her work with S-RuM has been shown to have many applications for miniaturization of passive components for RF and power applications. She has also contributed to efforts to develop DNA-based data storage devices.

Li holds over 20 patents related to MacEtch, S-RuM, and novel semiconductor nanowires. She has published over 160 per-reviewed journal publications, and has written 4 chapters in books. She has also served as editor for numerous journals, including Associate Editor for IEEE Photonics Journal, Guest editor for Journal of Electronic Materials, Associate Editor for IEEE Transactions on Nanotechnology, and Deputy Editor for Applied Physics Letters. She has advised over 18 Ph.D. students and numerous M.S. students and undergraduates.
