= Jennifer Sadler =

Australian beach volleyball player (born 1993)

Jen Sadler

Personal information
- Full name: Jennifer Sadler
- Nickname: Saddles
- Nationality: Australian
- Born: 18 March 1993 (age 33)
- Hometown: Leeming
- Height: 186 cm (73 in)
- Spike: 301 cm (119 in)
- Block: 285 cm (112 in)
- Education: Rossmoyne Senior High & Yavapai College

Volleyball information
- Position: Opposite
- Current club: Australian National Team
- Number: 11 (national team)

Career
Years	Teams
2016 - 2017	Western Australia - Pearls
2012 - 2015	Yavapai College, Arizona, USA

National team
2015 – Current	Australia

Jennifer Sadler (born 18 March 1993) is an Australian female volleyball and beach volleyball player. She started playing Volleyball at age 13 and went on to represent Australia as a junior from 2008 to 2011. Sadler currently trains at the Australian Institute of Sport, Centre of Excellence.

In 2015 Sadler was named in the Australian Volleyroos Women's Squad and has participated in all Volleyball World Grand Prix's since.
