= Jeanne E. Pemberton =

American chemist

- Citizenship: US
- Education: University of Delaware (BS, BA); University of North Carolina, Chapel Hill (PhD)
- Awards: Fellow of the American Association for the Advancement of Science (2009); Fellow of the American Chemical Society (2009)
- Scientific career
- Fields: Analytical chemistry
- Workplaces: University of Arizona
- Thesis: Surface raman spectroelectrochemical, voltammetric, and xps investigation of the adsorption of dithizone anion at metal electrode surfaces (1981)
- Doctoral students: Jani Ingram

Jeanne Ellen Pemberton is an American analytical chemist and Regents' Professor at the University of Arizona. Her research involves surface science and developing applications for glycolipids. In 1997, she was cofounder of the Committee on the Advancement of Women Chemists (COACh). She is an elected Fellow for several scientific societies, including the American Chemical Society and American Association for the Advancement of Science. She has leadership roles with the academic journals Annual Review of Analytical Chemistry and Analytical Chemistry.

== Education ==
Pemberton attended the University of Delaware for her undergraduate studies, earning a Bachelor of Science in biology and a Bachelor of Arts in chemistry. She then attended the University of North Carolina, Chapel Hill, where she earned a PhD with an emphasis in analytical chemistry.

== Career ==
Pemberton primarily researches surface science, using spectroscopic probes to explore interfacial chemistry. She also researches possible applications for glycolipids. She is co-founder of the company GlycoSurf, which researches the development of environmentally friendly glycolipid surfactants. Since 2005, she has been a Regents' Professor at the University of Arizona.

She has also been involved in initiatives to raise the profile of women in chemistry. In 1997, she cofounded the Committee on the Advancement of Women Chemists (COACh) along with Geraldine L. Richmond. COACh develops leadership and intellectual capacity among women in the sciences and engineering through professional development workshops.

== Awards and Honors ==
In 2009, she was elected as a Fellow of both the American Association for the Advancement of Science (AAAS) and the American Chemical Society.

She was co-editor of Annual Review of Analytical Chemistry from 2012-2021, and executive editor of Analytical Chemistry since 2019.

Pemberton received the American Chemical Society's Garvan–Olin Medal in 2023.

== Scientific Studies ==
=== Organic Semiconductor Chemistry ===
Pemberton's research focuses on the chemistry of organic semiconductor materials and the surfaces where different materials meet in electronic and photonic devices. Organic semiconductors are used as the active materials in technologies such as organic light-emitting diodes (OLEDs), lasers, and other electronic and optoelectronic devices. However, these materials often have limited lifetimes because they can slowly break down through chemical, photochemical, and physical processes while the device is operating. Pemberton's research aims to better understand why this degradation happens and how it affects the performance and stability of these devices.

=== Classical Molecular Dynamics Stimulation of Glycolic Liquids ===
Pemberton studied rhamnolipids, which are biodegradable biosurfactants that can also act as a type of ionic liquid called a glycolic liquid. Her research examined how these materials conduct electricity and how their conductivity changes depending on the type of ions present and the amount of water in the system. Using molecular dynamics simulations, she analyzed how networks formed by hydroxyl (-OH) groups develop inside the liquid and influence conductivity. Her work showed that the structure and connectivity of these molecular networks play an important role in determining how well the material conducts electricity.
