= Analytical and Bioanalytical Chemistry =

- Discipline: Chemistry
- Language: English
- Edited by: Alberto Cavazzini, Soledad Cárdenas Aranzana, Ulrich Panne, Sabine Szunerits, Qiuquan Wang, Wei Wang, Stephen A. Wise, Adam T. Woolley, Joseph Zaia

Publication details
- History: 1862–present
- Publisher: Springer (Germany)
- Frequency: biweekly
- Impact factor: 4.3 (2022)

Standard abbreviations
- ISO 4: Anal. Bioanal. Chem.

Indexing
- ISSN: 1618-2642 (print); 1618-2650 (web)

Links
- Journal homepage

Analytical and Bioanalytical Chemistry (ABC) is a peer-reviewed scientific journal publishing research articles in the broad field of analytical and bioanalytical chemistry. Some of the subjects covered are the development of instruments for mass spectrometry, metallomics, ionics, and the analytical characterization of nano- and biomaterials. The journal was first published in 1862 under the name Fresenius’ Journal of Analytical Chemistry. In 2002 the journal was renamed to Analytical and Bioanalytical Chemistry.

== Impact factor ==
Analytical and Bioanalytical Chemistry (ABC) had an impact factor of 4.3 as of 2022, and five years impact factor is 4.0.

== Editors ==
The editors of the journal are Alberto Cavazzini, Soledad Cárdenas Aranzana, Ulrich Panne, Sabine Szunerits, Qiuquan Wang, Wei Wang, Stephen A. Wise, Adam T. Woolley, Joseph Zaia.

== Literature ==
- Wilhelm Fresenius: One hundred and forty years "Fresenius' Journal of Analytical Chemistry", in: Fresenius J Anal Chem (2001) 71:1041-1042
