= Datawatch Corporation =

- Type: Public
- Traded as: Nasdaq: DWCH
- Industry: Computer software
- Founded: 1985; 41 years ago, in Delaware
- Fate: Acquired by Altair Engineering
- Headquarters: Bedford, Massachusetts, United States
- Number of locations: 7 (Bedford, New York, Greensboro, Maidenhead, Frankfurt, Stockholm, Manila)
- Products: Monarch Complete, Monarch Server (Automation, Content, Report Mining), Monarch Swarm, Monarch Table Extractor
- Number of employees: 139 (Q4 2017)
- Website: www.datawatch.com

Datawatch Corporation (now part of Altair) was an American software company that creates and sells self-service data preparation solutions. The entire platform included Datawatch Monarch Complete, Monarch Server and Monarch Swarm.

== History ==
Datawatch began as a business intelligence (BI) tool.

1985-1991: Datawatch established as a private company.

In the beginning, Datawatch designed, manufactured, and marketed computer workstations and peripherals that conformed to the U.S. government’s TEMPEST security standard for processing classified information. This security standard was designed to prevent unauthorized access to information in computing devices by limiting their electrical emissions.

1991: Datawatch acquired Personics Corporation, a producer of network data access and translation software and video enhancement software. Personics’ principal product was Monarch, a software program that provided data access, translation, and reporting capabilities to users of networked PCs.

1992: Datawatch went public with an IPO.

2013: Datawatch acquired Panopticon Software AB, a Swedish software company whose primary product was Panopticon Designer, a visual data discovery application that can create visualizations of streaming real-time data.

2016: Datawatch was going back to focus on their principle Monarch software to address the need of self-service data preparation market for data visualization tool and release the new Monarch Data Prep Studio in the 13.0 release.

2018: Datawatch acquired Angoss, a Canada-based provider of predictive analytics software and services. Datawatch was acquired by Altair Engineering for $13.10 a share at $176 Million.

== Technology overview ==
Datawatch's technology relies on in-memory OLAP (Online Analytical Processing) cubes, which are displayed through a series of visualizations including treemaps. This allows the user to load data, select variables and hierarchical structures, and navigate through the resultant visualization, filtering, zooming and drilling (sometimes called slicing and dicing), to identify outliers, correlations and trends.

Its streaming OLAP implementation takes an in-memory OLAP cube and allows data to be streamed through it. This combination makes the company's products attractive to industry verticals that require live streaming data, such as financial market data, utility grid monitoring and telecommunications network traffic analysis. This is very different than the vast majority of OLAP implementations in which cubes are rebuilt periodically for new batches of data.

This support for streaming data with its products has allowed financial institutions such as JPMorgan Chase, Citigroup, Citadel, and BlackRock to implement the Datawatch software within their real-time trading and risk applications. Euromoney has stated that it provides the trader community with a way of quickly digesting information.

Datawatch offers three main products: Datawatch Designer, Datawatch Server and Monarch software.

== Joint ventures ==
In December, 2013 Xerox Canada and Datawatch partner to unlock value of data for retail chains, other large enterprises. In February, 2014 Datawatch announced a Global Strategic Alliance with MarkLogic. In February, 2014 Datawatch announced a partnership with Monarch Experts, the leading specialist consultancy in London. Monarch Experts will help existing Datawatch customers transition to the new Visual Data Discovery platform. In March, 2014 Datawatch named Carahsoft Technology as its Master Government Aggregator. Carahsoft, a government IT solutions provider, is now marketing and selling Datawatch’s solutions to the public sector. March, 2014, Datawatch announced its global partnership with OSIsoft and the release of its real-time data connector to the PI System.

In April, 2014 Datawatch integrated its software with Cloudant's NoSQL database-as-a-service DBaaS. In May, 2014 Datawatch announced a Global Relationship with Informatica, as well as support for IBM Cognos TM1 and a Global Strategic Alliance with Perceptive They announced a partnership with MDS Tech Inc joined the Industrial Internet Consortium announced OEM agreement with Kx Systems NASDAQ OMX launched MiQ with a partnership with Datawatch. In June 2014 Datawatch announced predictive analytics solution with partner Quant5 announced support for Cloudera Enterprise 5 and announced solution developed with First Florida Credit Union.
