= Monarch (software) =

Desktop report mining tool

- Release: 1990
- Stable release: 2025.1
- Website: https://www.altair.com/monarch

Monarch is a report mining tool used to extract and re-use data from computer-generated human-readable reports. With Monarch, users define models that describe the layout and extraction of data in the report. This allows end-users to efficiently re-purpose data from existing reports over which they have no control.

The first version of Monarch was published in 1990 for MS-DOS. Monarch for Windows was released in 1994. The latest release is version 2025.1. Monarch was originally developed by Math Strategies for Personics Corporation, which was acquired by Datawatch Corporation in 1991. Datawatch Corporation was later acquired by Altair Engineering in 2018, which itself was acquired by Siemens in 2025. Over 500,000 copies of Monarch have been licensed, and the software is in use in over 40,000 organizations.

Monarch allows users to re-use information from existing computer reports, such as text, PDF and HTML files. Monarch can also import data from OLE DB/ODBC data sources, spreadsheets and desktop databases. Users define models that describe the layout of data in the report file, and the software parses the data into a tabular format. The parsed data can be further enhanced with links to external data sources, filters, sorts, calculated fields and summaries. The data can be exported to a variety of formats, primarily spreadsheets.
