= FEKO =

Engineering software

Feko
- Developer: Altair Engineering
- Stable release: 2020 / June 2020; 6 years ago
- Operating system: Microsoft Windows and Linux
- Type: EM simulation software
- License: Proprietary commercial software
- Website: Altair website

Feko is a computational electromagnetics software product developed by Altair Engineering. The name is derived from the German acronym "Feldberechnung bei Körpern mit beliebiger Oberfläche", which can be translated as "field calculations involving bodies of arbitrary shape". It is a general purpose 3D electromagnetic (EM) simulator.

Feko originated in 1991 from research activities of Dr. Ulrich Jakobus at the University of Stuttgart, Germany. Cooperation between Dr. Jakobus and EM Software & Systems (EMSS) resulted in the commercialisation of FEKO in 1997. In June 2014, Altair Engineering acquired 100% of EMSS-S.A. and its international distributor offices in the United States, Germany and China, leading to the addition of FEKO to the Altair Hyperworks suite of engineering simulation software. In March 2025, Siemens acquired Altair Engineering, leading to the addition of Feko to its Simcenter suite of engineering simulation software.

The software is based on the Method of Moments (MoM) integral formulation of Maxwell's equations and pioneered the commercial implementation of various hybrid methods such as:

- Finite Element Method (FEM) / MoM where a FEM region is bounded with an integral equation based boundary condition to ensure full coupling between the FEM and MoM solution areas of the problem.
- MoM / Physical Optics (PO) where computationally expensive MoM current elements are used to excite computationally inexpensive PO elements, inducing currents on the PO elements. Special features in the FEKO implementation of the MoM/PO hybrid include the analysis of dielectric or magnetically coated metallic surfaces.
- MoM / Geometrical Optics (GO) where rays are launched from radiating MoM elements.
- MoM / Uniform Theory of Diffraction (UTD) where computationally expensive MoM current elements are used to excite canonical UTD shapes (plates, cylinders) with ray-based principles of which the computational cost is independent of wavelength.

A Finite Difference Time Domain (FDTD) solver was added in May 2014 with the release of FEKO Suite 7.0.

Numerous scientific publications that mention Feko can be found in the (open-access) journals of the Applied Computational Electromagnetics Society (ACES).
