= Altair Engineering =

American multinational information technology

Altair Engineering Inc.

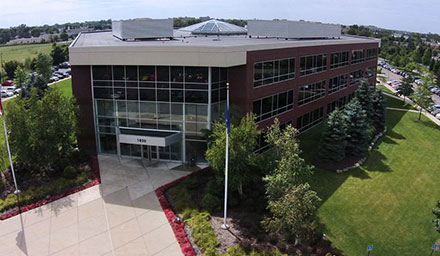
- Headquarters in Troy, Michigan
- Type: Subsidiary
- Industry: CAE Software; Product Design and Development; Simulation; Data Analytics; Artificial Intelligence; IoT; High-Performance Computing
- Founded: 1985; 41 years ago
- Founders: James R. Scapa; George Christ; Mark Kistner
- Headquarters: Troy, Michigan, U.S.
- Key people: James R. Scapa (chairman & CEO); Matthew Brown (CFO)
- Revenue: ▲US$665.8 million (2024)
- Operating income: ▲US$17.7 million (2024)
- Net income: ▲US$14.2 million (2024)
- Total assets: ▲US$1.446 billion (2024)
- Number of employees: 3,000+ (2024)
- Parent: Siemens AG
- Website: altair.com

Altair Engineering Inc. is an American multinational information technology company headquartered in Troy, Michigan, that provides software and cloud solutions for simulation, IoT, high performance computing (HPC), data analytics, and artificial intelligence (AI).

The firm develops and provides software and cloud services for product development, high-performance computing (HPC), simulation, artificial intelligence, and data intelligence. Altair is the creator of the HyperWorks CAE software product, among numerous other software packages and suites.

Founded in 1985, the company went public in 2017 and was traded on the Nasdaq stock exchange under the symbol ALTR. In 2025, it was acquired by Siemens for $10.6 billion.

== History ==
=== Founding ===
Altair Engineering was founded in 1985 by James R. Scapa, George Christ, and Mark Kistner in Troy, Michigan. Since the company's outset, Scapa has served as its CEO (and now chairman).

Initially, Altair started as an engineering consulting firm, but branched out into product development and computer-aided engineering (CAE) software. In the 1990s, it became known for its software products like HyperWorks, OptiStruct, and HyperMesh, which were often used for product development by the automotive industry.

Some of Altair's early clients included the Ford Motor Company, General Motors, and Chrysler. Its software also aided in the development of the Young America and AmericaOne racing yachts, the former of which was used to compete in the 1995 America's Cup.

Its software also found uses in other sectors, including aerospace (NASA), aviation (Airbus), consumer electronics (Nokia), and toy manufacturing (Mattel), among others. In 2002, Altair software aided in the design of the Airbus A380 by weight optimizing the aircraft wing ribs.

Also in 2002, Altair opened offices in Seongnam, South Korea and Shanghai, China, adding those locales to its international footprint alongside India where it had begun investment in 1992.

=== Early 2000's and 2017 IPO ===
In addition to its software production, Altair hires out engineering consultants to its corporate clientele. Its consultancy services accounted for the majority of the company's revenue until 2004, when the sale and licensing of software overtook that. In October of that year, General Atlantic invested $30 million in Altair. Also in 2004, Altair partnered with General Motors and the United States Department of Defense on the design and construction of a new military vehicle.

Altair also branched out into the life sciences, finance, and pharmaceutical industries with its high performance computing software, PBS Professional, which it had acquired the rights to in 2003. In June 2006, Altair acquired the French CAE software company, Mecalog, and its Radioss technology suite. In 2007, it spun off a new wholly owned subsidiary called ilumisys, which would focus on light-emitting diode (LED) lamps designed to be used as direct replacements for fluorescent light tubes. Ilumisys' operations were moved to Michigan in 2011, and it was rebranded as Toggled in 2012.

In the early 2010s, Altair's product design division (Altair ProductDesign) began creating prototypes of various vehicles including a hydraulic hybrid transit bus known as BUSolution and an electric concept car called the Avant GT. By 2013, the company had offices in 19 countries worldwide and 1,800 employees. That year, it also bought out General Atlantic's equity stake in the company.

In 2016, Altair acquired Solid Iris Technologies. The company developed a photorealistic rendering and visualization tool named Thea Render. By bringing this technology in-house, additional Solid Iris rendering capabilities were added to Altairs technologies.

On November 1, 2017, Altair went public with an IPO on the Nasdaq stock exchange and began trading under the stock ticker symbol ALTR. The company raised $156 million with share prices starting at $13. In the years leading up to the IPO, Altair acquired 11 different companies with strategic assets and expertise in fields like material science, electronics, industrial design, rendering, and others. The company then made its products available to qualified startup companies through its Startup Program, formed in 2018 and relaunched in 2021.

By 2019, the company had acquired a total of 30 businesses. It also began making efforts to incorporate artificial intelligence technology into its new software packages. That year, it opened a new office in Greensboro, North Carolina after acquiring the data analytics company, Datawatch, which had offices in the area.

=== 2020s ===
In June 2020, the company announced that it would be providing software updates for all of its products. The updates were implemented to improve workflows and provide access to a broader set of tools for data analytics, machine learning, and physics. In January 2021, Altair announced that it would collaborate with Rolls-Royce Holdings on a project using AI and machine learning to improve the aero jet engine design process. In November 2021, Altair's PBS Professional workload manager was selected by the Argonne National Laboratory to be used across the organization's high performance computing (HPC) systems, including the Polaris and Aurora supercomputers. That same month, Altair was also included on Inc. Magazine's 2021 Best-Led Companies list. In December, Altair was named as one of Investor's Business Daily's Best 100 ESG Companies.

In March 2023, Altair rebranded its AI and data analytics product now known as Altair RapidMiner. In May 2023, the US Court of Appeals issued a favorable ruling in a copyright infringement case pertaining to SAS software. In October 2023, Altair acquired OmniQuest, a software company out of Novi, Michigan, to further its optimization technology.

On October 30, 2024, Altair announced its agreement to be acquired by Siemens. The acquisition was finalized in March 2025, with Altair integrated into the Siemens Digital Industries division.

== Corporate acquisitions ==
Since 1985, Altair has acquired over 30 businesses, business units, and software packages. The following is a list of selected corporate acquisitions:

| Year | Company | Business type | Location | Ref. |
|---|---|---|---|---|
| 2006 | Mecalog Group | CAE software | Antony, France | |
| 2008 | solidThinking | Industrial design software | Vicenza, Italy | |
| 2010 | SimLab Corporation | Feature-based modeling technology | Rancho Santa Margarita, California | |
| 2011 | Acusim Software, Inc. | Computational fluid dynamics technology | Mountain View, California | |
| 2014 | EM Software & Systems (EMSS) | Electromagnetic technology software | Stellenbosch, South Africa | |
| 2014 | Visual Solutions, Inc. | Mathematical modeling, simulation, and model-based embedded system development | Westford, Massachusetts | |
| 2016 | CEDRAT S.A. | Low frequency electromagnetics simulations for electric motor design | Grenoble, France | |
| | Magsoft Corporation | (CEDRAT subsidiary) | New York | |
| 2017 | MODELiiS | Electronic design automation (EDA) technology | Grenoble, France | |
| | Runtime Design Automation | High performance computing | Santa Clara, California | |
| | Carriots S.L. | IoT application enablement platform (AEP) | Madrid, Spain | |
| | Componeering Inc. | Composite structural analysis and design technology | Helsinki, Finland | |
| 2018 | TES International | Computational fluid dynamics (CFD) technology | Michigan | |
| 2018 | SimSolid | Structural analysis simulation | Mississauga, Ontario, Canada | |
| 2018 | Datawatch Corporation | Data analytics technology | Bedford, Massachusetts | |
| 2018 | FluiDyna GmbH | NVIDIA CUDA and GPU-based Computational Fluid Dynamics (CFD) and numerical simulation technologies | Madrid, Spain | |
| | CANDI Controls, Inc. (Intellectual Property Assets) | Cloud-based SaaS; platform connects edge gateway computers to IoT devices | Oakland, California | |
| 2019 | Polliwog Co. | EDA technology | Seoul, South Korea | |
| 2019 | SEAM Software (from Cambridge Collaborative) | Noise and vibration predictive technology | Concord, Massachusetts | |
| 2019 | DEM Solutions | Discrete Element Method software used for the simulation and bulk and granular material | Edinburgh, UK | |
| 2019 | newFASANT | Computational and high-frequency electromagnetics | Alcala de Henares, Spain | |
| 2020 | WRAP Software (from WRAP International) | Spectrum management and radio network planning | Sweden | |
| 2020 | S&Wise Co., Ltd. | Polyurethane foam processing solution | Seoul, South Korea | |
| 2020 | Univa | Workload management, scheduling, HPC, and AI | Hoffman Estates, Illinois | |
| 2020 | M-Base Engineering + Software GmbH | Supplier of material database and material information systems | Aachen, Germany | |
| 2020 | Ellexus | Input/Output (I/O) analysis tool | Cambridge, England | |
| 2021 | Flow Simulator (from GE Aviation) | Flow, heat transfer, and combustion design software | Evendale, Ohio | |
| 2021 | S-FRAME Software | Structural analysis and design software | British Columbia, Canada | |
| 2021 | World Programming | Data Science and Data Engineering Specializing in Analytics | Hampshire, United Kingdom | |
| 2022 | Cassini | Next-gen cloud native technology for Industry 4.0 | Hyderabad, India | |
| 2022 | Powersim | Simulation and design tools for power electronics | Rockville, Maryland | |
| 2022 | Gen3D | Additive manufacturing design software | Bath, England | |
| 2022 | Concept Engineering | Electronic system visualization software | Freiburg, Germany | |
| 2022 | RapidMiner | Data science Data Analytics and AI platform | Dortmund, Germany | |
| 2023 | OmniV | Digital Engineering | UK | |
| 2024 | Cambridge Semantics | Knowledge graph technology | Boston, MA | |
| 2024 | Research in Flight | Computational fluid dynamics software | Auburn, AL | |
| 2024 | Metrics Design Automation | A simulation as a service (SaaS) business model for semiconductor electronic functional simulation and design verification | Ottawa | |
| 2024 | KSK Analytics | Consulting and training in artificial intelligence and data analytics | Japan | |

== See also ==
- Finite Element Software
- FEKO
- Monarch
- Portable Batch System
- Computational Grid
- Big Data
- Distributed Computing
- Cloud Computing
- Data Analytics
- Optimization
