= List of people from Cary, North Carolina =

Cary, North Carolina is a town in Wake, Chatham, and Durham counties in the U.S. state of North Carolina, and is part of the Raleigh-Cary, NC Metropolitan Statistical Area. Following is a list of some of the notable people from Cary.

== Academia ==
- Spright Dowell, former president of Alabama Polytechnic Institute, now Auburn University
- Peter Kilpatrick, president of Catholic University of America

== Business and technology ==
- James Goodnight, co-founder and CEO of SAS Institute and co-founder of Cary Academy
- Travis May, technology company founder, CEO, and president
- Hilda Pinnix–Ragland, business executive and philanthropist
- John Sall, co-founder of SAS Institute and co-founder of Cary Academy
- Tim Sweeney, founder and CEO of Epic Games

== Entertainment ==
- John Altschuler, television and film writer and producer
- Debbie Antonelli, sports commentator
- Katelyn Clampett, country singer-songwriter
- Carter Cruise, DJ, model, and pornographic actress
- John Custer, record producer and musician
- Anoop Desai, singer-songwriter and contestant on American Idol
- Tim Downs, author and comic strip artist of Downstown
- Justin Jedlica, model and businessman
- Jan Johansson, bluegrass musician
- Bevin Prince, actress
- Ainsley Seiger, actress
- Curtis Waters, recording artist

== Literature ==
- Marshall Brain, author
- Ben Fountain, author and recipient of the National Book Critics Circle Award and PEN/Hemingway Award
- Andrew Hubner, novelist and academic
- Sabrina Jeffries, author
- Rysa Walker, author

== Medicine and science ==
- Lianne Gonsalves, officer for the Department of Sexual and Reproductive Health and Research at the World Health Organization in Geneva

== Politics ==
- Gale Adcock, politician and director of corporate health services for SAS Institute
- Nida Allam, Durham County commissioner and political analyst
- Vernetta Alston, North Carolina House of Representatives and attorney
- Fred Bond Jr., tobacco industry representative and former mayor of Cary
- Koka Booth, former mayor of Cary
- Linda Hinkleman Gunter, North Carolina House of Representatives and educator
- Alfred Daniel Jones, former U.S. Consul General in Shanghai
- Wiley Nickel, former member of the U.S. House of Representatives and member of the North Carolina Senate
- Robert N. Page, U.S. House of Representatives
- Walter Hines Page, journalist and U.S. ambassador to Great Britain during World War I
- Harold Weinbrecht, former mayor of Cary and former programmer for SAS Institute
- Jennifer Weiss, former member of the North Carolina House of Representative

== Sports ==
- Brian Ackley, soccer player
- Reggie Barnes, former pro skateboarder; founder and owner of Eastern Skateboard Supply
- Chucky Brown, former professional basketball player
- Chris Castor, former professional football player
- Héctor Cotto, Olympic track and field athlete
- Claire Curzan, Olympic swimmer
- Chris Flemmings, professional basketball player
- Kendall Fletcher, professional soccer player
- Paul Gervase, MLB pitcher
- Vance Heafner, professional golfer who played on the PGA Tour
- Charlotte Hook, swimmer
- Isaiah Johnson, professional football player
- Greg Jones, professional baseball player
- Scott Kooistra, professional football player
- Glen Lang, former professional hockey player, former mayor of Cary, and CEO of Capitol Broadband
- Luke Maye, professional basketball player
- Trey Murphy III, professional basketball player
- Max Povse, professional baseball player
- Morgan Reid, professional soccer player
- Justin Ress, competitive swimmer who represented the United States at the 2017 World Aquatics Championships
- Anthony Rush, current NFL defensive tackle
- Saiyan (Ryan Danford), former professional esports player
- Mark Scalf, baseball coach
- Zack Schilawski, former pro soccer player and assistant coach at UNC Wilmington
- Vic Sorrell, former MLB pitcher and World Series champion
- Ryan Spaulding, professional soccer player
- Azurá Stevens, professional basketball player
- Aaron Ward, former professional hockey player
- Kay Yow, former head coach of women's basketball at North Carolina State University
- Katie Zaferes, professional triathlete
