= 2007 Cary, North Carolina, mayoral election =

- October 9, 2007
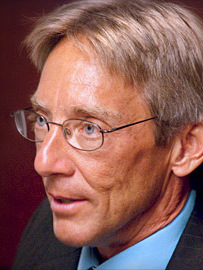

Candidate	Harold Weinbrecht	Ernie McAlister
Party	Nonpartisan	Nonpartisan
Popular vote	10,122	7,194
Percentage	58.31%	41.44%
Mayor before election
Ernie McAlister
Nonpartisan
Elected mayor
Harold Weinbrecht
Nonpartisan

Cary, North Carolina, held an election for mayor on Tuesday, October 9, 2007. Harold Weinbrecht won an upset victory against incumbent mayor Ernie McAlister.

== Issues ==
The main issue of the 2007 mayoral election was managing high population growth in Cary. Between 1990 and 2000, Cary's population grew 115.6% from 43,858 to 94,536. The Raleigh-Cary area was the fastest growing metro area in the United States between 2000 and 2010 according to the U.S. Census. Former mayor Koka Booth (1987–1999) oversaw a period of rapid expansion. His successor, Glen Lang (1999–2003) advocated for slower growth and increased fees for residential developments. Under Lang's leadership, Cary's annual population growth rate decreased from 13% to 3%. Incumbent mayor Ernie McAlister succeeded Glen Lang in 2003 and supported policies returning to fast growth.

By 2007, ongoing residential and commercial development led to community concerns about overcrowding and traffic. In particular, a new development with offices, shops, and condos on the northeast corner of Highhouse Road and Davis Drive became a flashpoint of the election. The project was supported by McAlister and narrowly approved by the town council. Opponents argued that the area was already overly congested.

McAlister was challenged by Harold Weinbrecht who campaigned on "balanced growth". Weinbrecht had served on the town council since 1999. Weinbrecht's uncle Fred Bond was mayor of Cary from 1971 to 1983. McAlister's campaign criticized Weinbrecht's fiscal policies, asserting that his proposals would lead to increased municipal spending and higher taxes.

McAlister spent $217,762 on the election compared to Weinbrecht who spent $50,223. McAlister received large donations from development and real estate groups. McAlister donations included $4,000 from Gregory Sanchez, president of Triproperties development firm, $4,000 from Greg Sandreuter, president of real estate company Hamilton Merritt, $4,000 from the N.C. Home Builders Association PAC, $3,000 from the N.C. Realtors PAC, and $1,700 from three associates of Crosland Group. Crosland Group was the developer behind the controversial new project at Highhouse Road and Davis Drive. In contrast, most of Weinbrecht contributions were composed of smaller $25 to $50 donations. Weinbrecht received $500 from Barbara Lang, wife of former mayor Glen Lang, and $500 from DavisandHighHouse.org, a political group formed to oppose the Crosland Group's development.

== Results ==
Weinbrecht won an upset victory against McAlister, despite being out-spent 6-to-1. The four districts adjacent to the Davis Drive and High House road development voted for Weinbrecht with margins ranging from 69% to 71% in his favor.

2007 Cary mayoral election
Party	Candidate	Votes	%	±%
Nonpartisan	Harold Weinbrecht (incumbent)	10,122	58.31	
Nonpartisan	Ernie McAlister	7,194	41.44	
Other	Write-ins	44	0.25	N/A
Turnout		17,360		

== See also ==
- List of mayors of Cary, North Carolina
