= List of mayors of Cary, North Carolina =

Mayors of the town of Cary, North Carolina, USA

Mayor of Cary, North Carolina
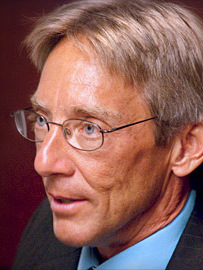
- Incumbent; Harold Weinbrecht since December 2007
- Type: Mayor
- Term length: 4 years
- Formation: 1871
- First holder: Allison Francis Page

The following is a list of mayors of the town of Cary, North Carolina, United States. The mayor is the highest elected official in Cary. The current mayor is Harold Weinbrecht who took office in December 2007.

Frank Page, the founder of Cary, also became its first mayor in 1871. His successor, Rufus H. Jones, became the first elected mayor in 1872. In 1961, Cary changed from a commission-type government to a council-manager form of government following a referendum. Under the new system, the councilmen elected the mayor instead of a direct election. In 1975, Cary mayors returned to being directly elected.

== List of mayors ==
Early records of Cary are lost. Town records were destroyed during a fire in 1908 and also lost in 1937 following the resignation of the mayor, town clerk, and police chief at the same time. Mayors from before 1937 in years with no town records were lost. In 2021, Cary historians Carla Michaels and Matthew Champagne pieced together early mayors using local newspapers archives. Their list was published in Cary Through the Years, the Sesquicentennial Edition, the source for this list.

Mayor	Term start	Term end
Allison Francis Page	1871	1872
Rufus H. Jones	1872	1874
James R. Page	1874	1884
James P. H. Adams	1884	1887
Robert J. Harrison	1887	1895
John C. Angier	1895	1899
Charles R. Scott	1899	1901
Thomas F. Wilkinson	1901	1902
Robert J. Harrison	1902	1903
Henry B. Jordan	1903	1909
Needham C. Hines	1909	1911
James M. Templeton Jr.	1911	1915
Thomas J. Taylor	1915	1921
William G. Crowder	1921	1921^{[a]}
Edward P. Bradshaw	1921	1921^{[b]}
William H. Atkins	1921	1923
George H. Jordan, Sr.	1923	1925^{[b]}
Edward P. Bradshaw	1925	1927
Dr. Francis R. Yarborough	1927	1928^{[b]}
Alvin N. Jackson	1928	1929
Harvey H. Waddell	1929	1933
Dr. John P. Hunter	1933	1935
Marvin T. Jones	1935	1935^{[b]}
Thomas W. Adickes	1935	1935^{[b]}
Leland L. Raines	1935	1937^{[b]}
Robert W. Mayton	1937	1947
Robert G. Setzer	1947	1949
Hood Waldo Rood	1949	1961
William H. Justice	1961	1962^{[b]}
James Hogarth	1962	1963
Dr. Edwin B. Davis, Jr.	1963	1969^{[b]}
Joseph R. Veasey	1969	1971
Frederick G. Bond	1971	1983
Harold D. Ritter	1983	1987
Koka E. Booth	1987	1999
Glen Lang	1999	2003
Ernie McAlister	2003	2007
Harold Weinbrecht	2007	Present

=== Notes ===
^a Died in office
^b Resigned from office

== See also ==
- 2023 Cary, North Carolina, mayoral election
- 2019 Cary, North Carolina, mayoral election
- 2015 Cary, North Carolina, mayoral election
- 2011 Cary, North Carolina, mayoral election
- 2007 Cary, North Carolina, mayoral election
- Cary history
