= 2019 Cary, North Carolina, mayoral election =

- October 8, 2019
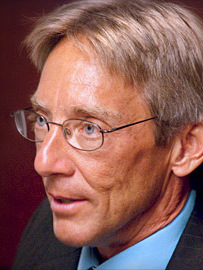

Candidate	Harold Weinbrecht	Dero-Asha Davis-Weeks
Party	Nonpartisan	Nonpartisan
Popular vote	13,525	2,358
Percentage	84.10%	14.66%
Mayor before election
Harold Weinbrecht
Nonpartisan
Elected mayor
Harold Weinbrecht
Nonpartisan

Cary, North Carolina, held an election for mayor on Tuesday, October 8, 2019.

On July 10, 2019, Harold Weinbrecht, the incumbent mayor, announced that he was running for re-election. He was first elected in 2007 and re-elected in 2011 and 2015. Dero-Asha Davis-Weeks was Weinbrecht's sole challenger.

Harold Weinbrecht was elected to a fourth term, winning 84.1% of the vote.

== Candidates ==
- Dero-Asha Davis-Weeks, pharmacist
- Harold Weinbrecht, Mayor of Cary since 2007

== Results ==
2019 Cary mayoral election
Party	Candidate	Votes	%	±%
Nonpartisan	Harold Weinbrecht (incumbent)	13,525	84.10	−11.27%
Nonpartisan	Dero-Asha Davis-Weeks	2,358	14.66	N/A
Other	Write-ins	200	1.24	N/A
Turnout		16,083	N/A	+199.22%

== See also ==
- List of mayors of Cary, North Carolina
