= Chop shop (disambiguation) =

Chop shop is a slang phrase with various uses including an illegal location or business which disassembles stolen automobiles for the purpose of selling them as parts.

Chop shop may also refer to:

- Chop Shop (TV series), a Canadian docusoap TV series directed by Ziad Touma about a "rock 'n' roll" hairdressers
- Chop Shop (film), a 2007 American film
- Chop Shop (novel), a 2004 novel by American writer Tim Downs
- Chop Shop (musician), also known as Scott Konzelmann, a noise musician
- Chop Shop: London Garage, a sequel to the TV series Bangla Bangers
- Chop Shop Records, a California-based record label
- Chop Shop, a fictional shop in Blue Sky Studios' Robots
