= Jan Johansson =

Jan Johansson is the name of:

- Jan Johansson (bluegrass musician) (born 1958), Swedish acoustic musician
- Jan Johansson (jazz musician) (1931–1968), Swedish jazz pianist
- Jan Johansson (bobsleigh) (born 1943), Olympic bobsledder
- Jan Emanuel Johansson (born 1974), Swedish healthcare entrepreneur and former Member of Parliament
- Jan Töve Johansson (born 1958), Swedish landscape photographer, publicist, writer
- Jan Johansson (bandy) (born 1935), Swedish bandy player awarded Stora Grabbars och Tjejers Märke
- Jan Johansson (chess player), winner of the 1989 Swedish Chess Championship

== See also ==
- Jan Johansen (disambiguation)
