= Abraham Baldwin Agricultural College =

Public college in Tifton, Georgia, U.S.

Coordinates: 31.4822°N 83.5273°W

- Type: Public college
- Established: 1908; 118 years ago
- Parent institution: University System of Georgia
- Endowment: 45.5 million (2026)
- President: Tracy Brundage
- Students: 4,110 (Fall 2026)
- Location: Tifton, Georgia, United States
- Campus: Rural
- Colors: Green and gold
- Nickname: Stallions
- Sporting affiliations: NAIA - SSAC
- Website: abac.edu

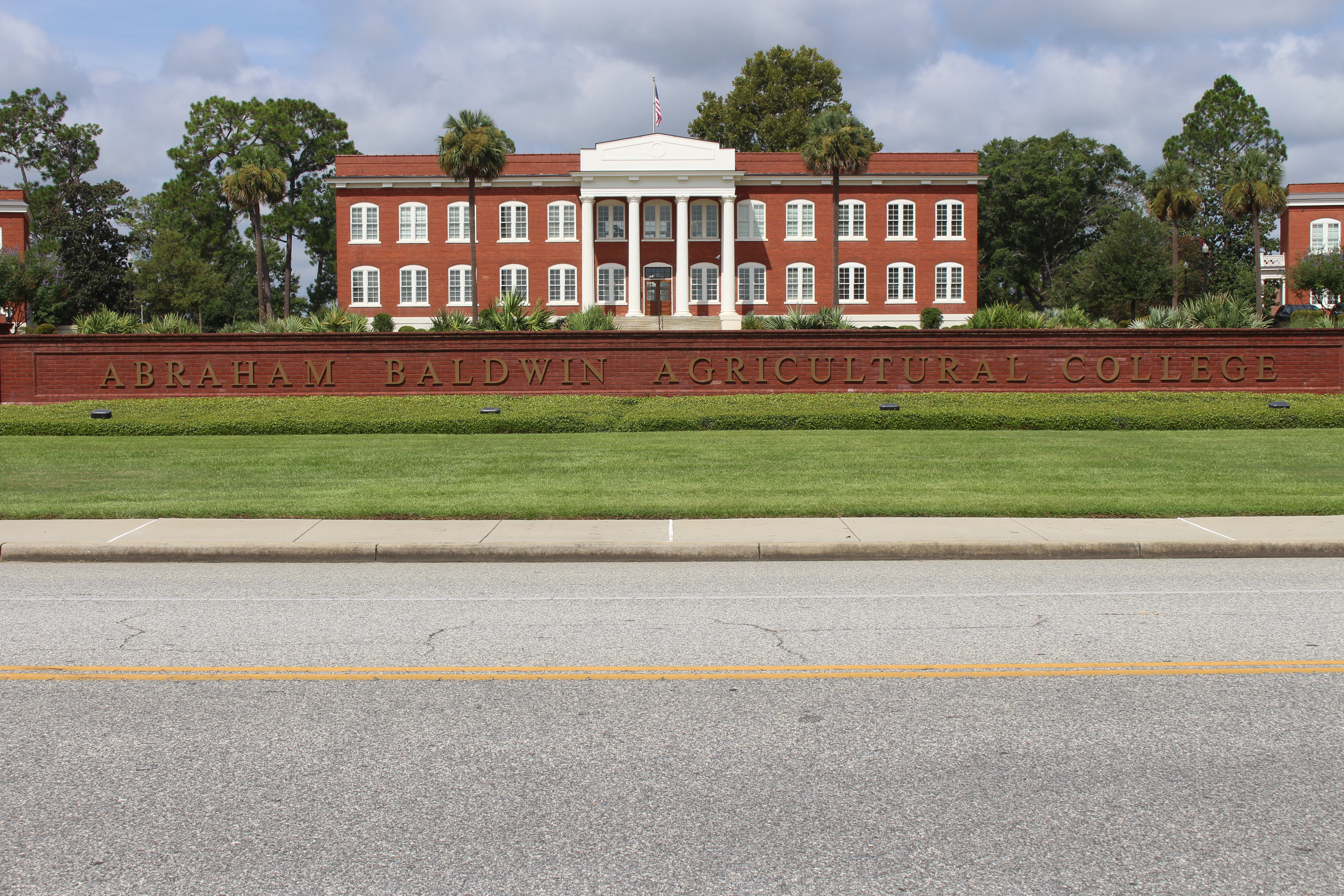
Abraham Baldwin Agricultural College front lawn

Abraham Baldwin Agricultural College (ABAC) is a public college in Tifton, Georgia, United States. It is part of the University System of Georgia and offers baccalaureate and associate degrees. The college is named after Abraham Baldwin, a signer of the United States Constitution from Georgia and the first president of the University of Georgia.

ABAC was established in 1908 as the Second District A&M School. The name was changed to the South Georgia A&M College in 1924, and to the Georgia State College for Men in 1929. It became Abraham Baldwin Agricultural College in 1933 when ABAC became a part of the newly formed University System of Georgia. At that time, ABAC's mission was devoted to associate level studies in agriculture, home economics, and related fields. Today, ABAC offers a variety of bachelor's degree programs as well as associate degrees.

== Campus ==
The ABAC campus is used as an open-air classroom for students in the School of Agriculture and Natural Resources due to the large number of trees, plants, shrubs, and fields on campus. ABAC faculty, staff, students and visitors also enjoy the well-manicured grounds of the college. A renovation project was recently completed for the original three buildings on campus, Tift, Lewis, and Herring Halls. New landscaping and a new front lawn for ABAC were also a part of the renovation process. ABAC has a lab science building that was opened in 2016. ABAC also has an instructional site in Bainbridge.

== Academics ==
The School of Agriculture and Natural Resources is the largest area of study at ABAC. The Forestry track of the Natural Resources Management program is accredited by the Society of American Foresters. Nursing is the largest single major. This associate degree program prepares students to be certified as a Registered Nurse (R.N.).

Learning laboratories such as the J.G. Woodroof Farm and the Forest Lakes Golf Club enhance the academic curriculum. ABAC's 516-acre campus also includes the Georgia Museum of Agriculture and Historic Village, one mile south of the main campus. Key components of the museum include an 1890s village, a blacksmith shop, a grist mill, a cotton gin, a print shop, a saw mill, and a steam locomotive.

== Student life ==
Undergraduate demographics as of Fall 2023
Race and ethnicity	Total
White	79%
Hispanic	10%
Black	8%
Asian	1%
International student	1%
Two or more races	1%
Economic diversity
Low-income (Note: The percentage of students who received an income-based federal Pell grant intended for low-income students.)	41%
Affluent (Note: The percentage of students who are a part of the American middle class at the bare minimum.)	59%

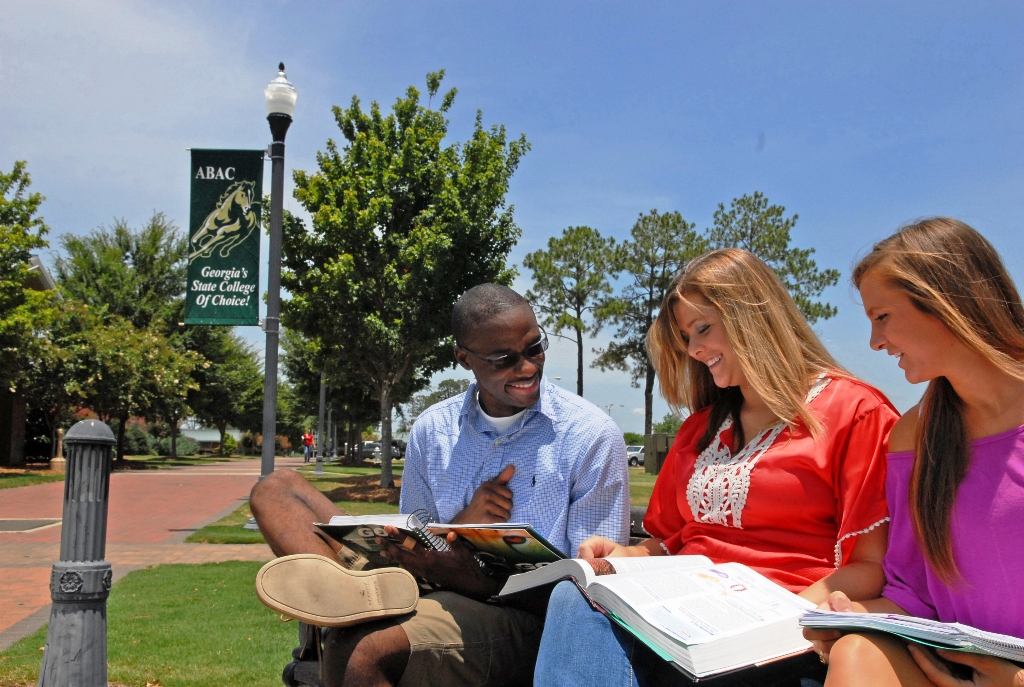
Students at the ABAC campus

There are numerous student organizations on the ABAC campus. Students have the opportunity to get involved with organizations ranging from the Student Government Association to the Forestry-Wildlife Club.

=== Campus media ===
The Stallion is the premier student newspaper in both the state and the southeast region. Staff of the literary magazine, Pegasus, and creative writing faculty sponsor numerous poetry readings each year. Other events include a Writer's Harvest and contributions to the George Scott Day festival.

ABAC also has its own radio station, WPLH 103.1.

=== Athletics ===
ABAC is a member of the National Association of Intercollegiate Athletics (NAIA) competing in the Southern States Athletic Conference (SSAC). Intercollegiate sports teams include basketball, baseball, golf, and tennis for men, and basketball, softball, tennis, and soccer for women. ABAC has five national championships, three in softball and two in men's tennis.

=== Music ===
ABAC has achieved international attention through its music program. The music program at ABAC includes a jazz band, jazz choir, concert band, concert choir, bluegrass band, and pep band. The ABAC jazz band has been on three tours of Europe. ABAC vocalists performed in 2011 at Lincoln Center.

The ABAC Arts Connection brings art and cultural events to Tifton and surrounding counties. The Baldwin Players theatre troupe stage performances during the fall and spring semesters. Recently, ABAC became a member institution of the Georgia Poetry Circuit.

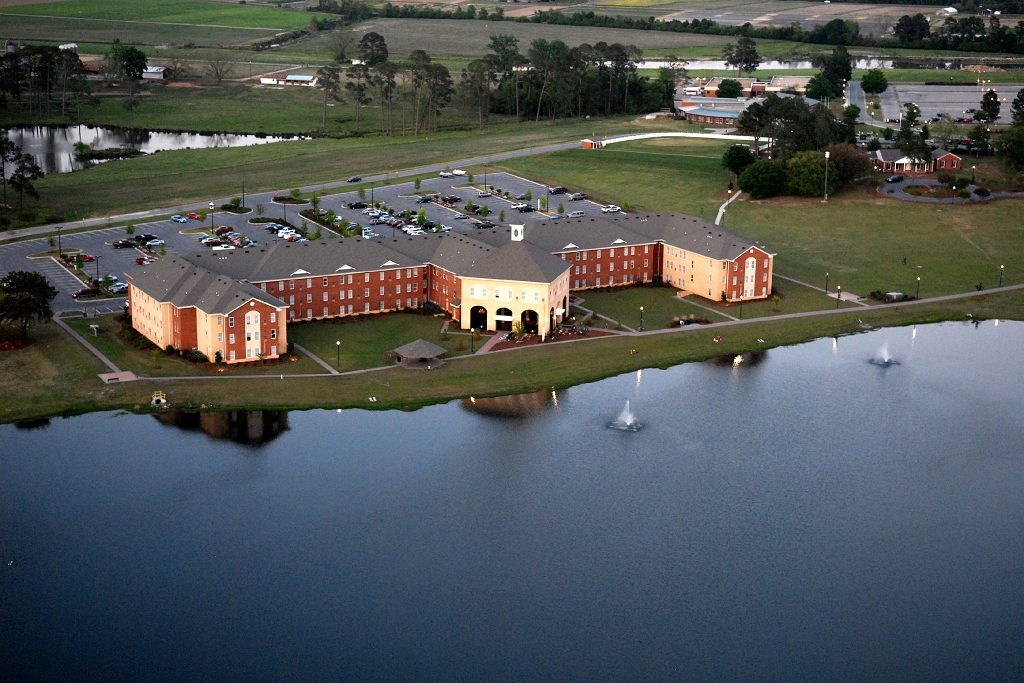
ABAC Lakeside

=== Greek life ===
ABAC has a Greek system with several fraternities on campus.

== Notable alumni ==
- Fred Bond, Jr., tobacco industry representative and politician
- Ralph Bryant, former major league baseball player who played with the Los Angeles Dodgers
- Tom Cheney, struck out the highest number of batters in a single Major League Baseball game playing for the Washington Senators
- Cathy Cox, former Secretary of State of Georgia
- Harris DeVane, stock car racing driver
- Kyle Farnsworth, former journeyman relief pitcher
- George Thornewell Smith, only person to win contested elections in all three branches of the state of Georgia government; former lieutenant governor
- Boo Weekley, professional golfer who plays on the PGA Tour
- Harold Bascom Durham Jr., received Medal of Honor for his actions in Vietnam
- Tyler Harper, former Georgia Senator, current Georgia Department of Agriculture Commissioner
- Michael Johns, Australian singer
