= 2023 Cary, North Carolina, mayoral election =

- October 10, 2023
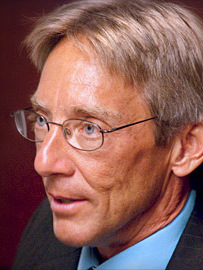

Candidate	Harold Weinbrecht	Write-ins
Party	Nonpartisan	Others
Popular vote	12,309	636
Percentage	95.09%	4.91%
Mayor before election
Harold Weinbrecht
Nonpartisan
Elected mayor
Harold Weinbrecht
Nonpartisan

Cary, North Carolina, held an election for mayor on Tuesday, October 10, 2023. Harold Weinbrecht, the incumbent mayor, ran unopposed and won re-election to a fifth term.

== Candidates ==
The only candidate on the ballot was mayor Harold Weinbrecht. The election was nonpartisan, however, Weinbrecht is affiliated with the Democratic Party.

== Results ==
2023 Cary mayoral election
Party	Candidate	Votes	%	±%
Nonpartisan	Harold Weinbrecht (incumbent)	12,309	95.09	+10.99
Other	Write-ins	636	4.91	N/A
Turnout		12,945		

== See also ==
- List of mayors of Cary, North Carolina
