= Koka Booth Amphitheatre =

Open-air concert venue in Cary, North Carolina

- Interactive map of Koka Booth Amphitheatre
- Former names: The Amphitheatre at Regency Park (2001-04)
- Address: 8003 Regency Pkwy; Cary, NC 27518-8503
- Coordinates: 35.728742°N 78.795737°W
- Owner: Town of Cary
- Operator: ASM Global & Outback Concerts
- Capacity: 7,000
- Type: Amphitheatre

Construction
- Opened: June 10, 2000
- Architect: William Rawn Associates

Website
- boothamphitheatre.com

The Koka Booth Amphitheatre is a performing arts amphitheatre in Cary, North Carolina, United States. It is located in Regency Park, which is owned and operated by the Town of Cary. The venue is managed by SMG, formally known as Spectacor Management Group. The venue was known as The Amphitheatre at Regency Park before the town's decision to name it after the former Cary mayor Koka Booth. It was constructed in 2000 on the north bank of the park's Symphony Lake.

The Booth Amphitheatre is located on Regency Parkway in southern Cary, which can be accessed by US Route 1/US 64 via the Tryon Road exit. The venue predominantly serves the Triangle area. The amphitheater, as well as adjacent Regency Park, has played host to the annual Cary 5K/10K since 2005.

== Entertainment ==
The Booth Amphitheatre has hosted many festivals and a number of concerts by the North Carolina Symphony and numerous other performers.

== See also ==
- List of contemporary amphitheatres
