= Jan Johansen =

Jan Johansen is the name of:

- Jan Johansen (canoeist) (born 1944), Norwegian Olympic canoeist
- Jan Johansen (politician) (born 1955), Danish politician and MF
- Jan Johansen (singer) (born 1966), Swedish singer
- Jan Arvid Johansen (1947–2017), Norwegian musician
- Anders Behring Breivik (born 1979; legal name), Norwegian terrorist

== See also ==
- Jan Johansson (disambiguation)
