= Cary High School =

Public school in Cary, North Carolina, US

Coordinates: 35.7717°N 78.7659°W

Location
- 638 Walnut St; Cary, Wake County, North Carolina 27511; United States

Information
- Former names: Cary Senior High School; Cary Public High School and Farm Life School
- Type: Public
- Motto: Cognitio Vincit (Knowledge Conquers)
- Established: 1896 (130 years ago)
- School district: Wake County Public School System
- NCES District ID: 3704720
- CEEB code: 340600
- NCES School ID: 370472001844
- Principal: Nolan Bryant
- Teaching staff: 122.65 (FTE)
- Grades: 9–12
- Enrollment: 2,136 (2023–2024)
- Student to teacher ratio: 17.42
- Colors: Kelly green and white
- Fight song: Notre Dame Victory March
- Athletics: NCHSAA 7A
- Athletics conference: Triangle Six 6A/7A
- Mascot: Imp
- Newspaper: The Page
- Yearbook: YRAC
- Website: Cary High School

Cary High School is one of six public high schools in Cary, North Carolina, and is part of the Wake County Public School System. In 1907, Cary High School became the first state-funded public high school in North Carolina. It was selected as a Blue Ribbon School in 2002.

== History ==
=== Original campus ===
Cary High School opened in 1896 as a private boarding school. It was established to provide "a higher course of instruction" than could be found in the local one-room schools of the area. It was located in the old Cary Academy at the head of Academy Street. Its first class graduated in May 1897. The school's first principal was Edwin Lee Middleton.

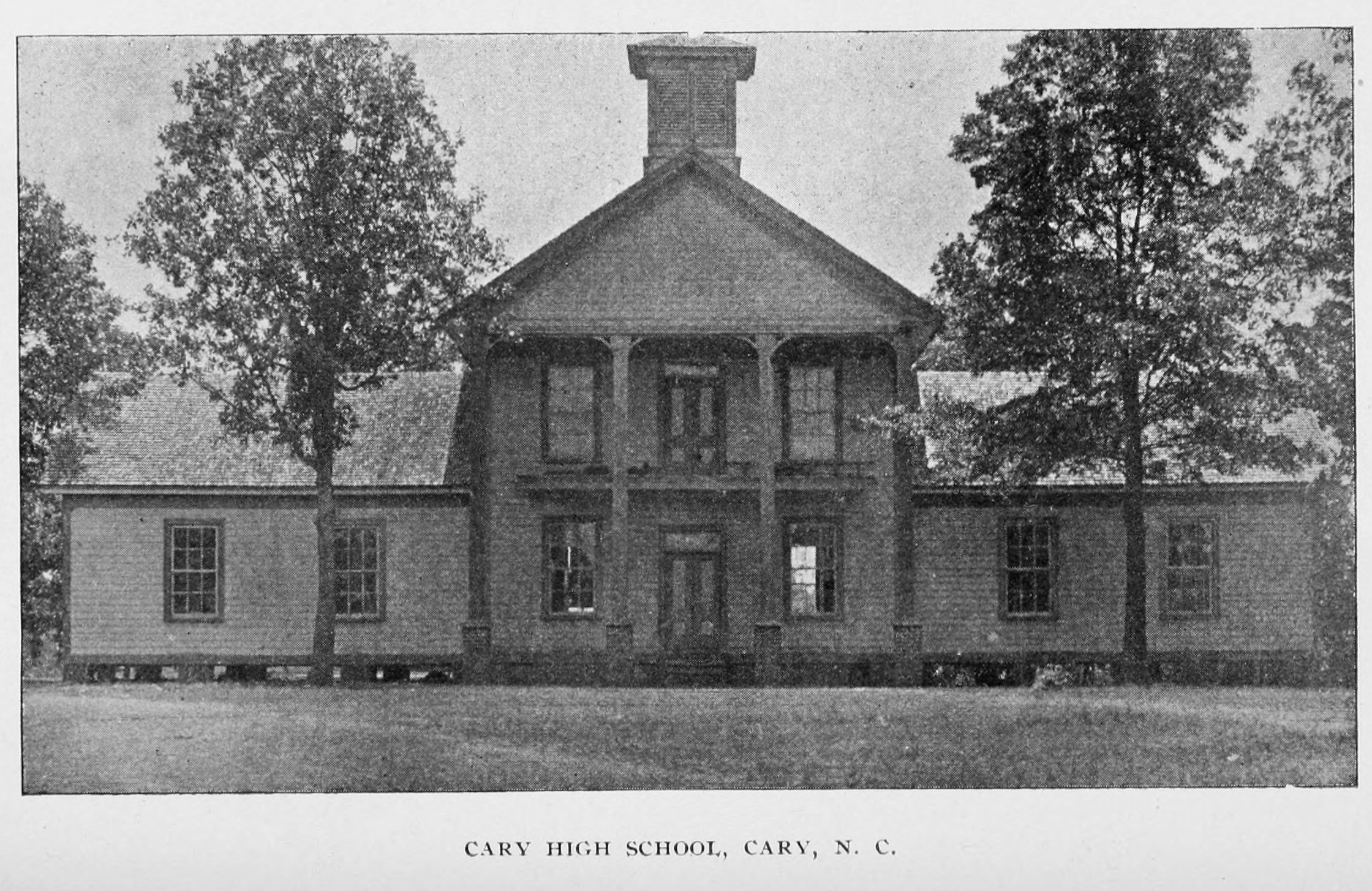
Cary High School circa 1896 to 1898

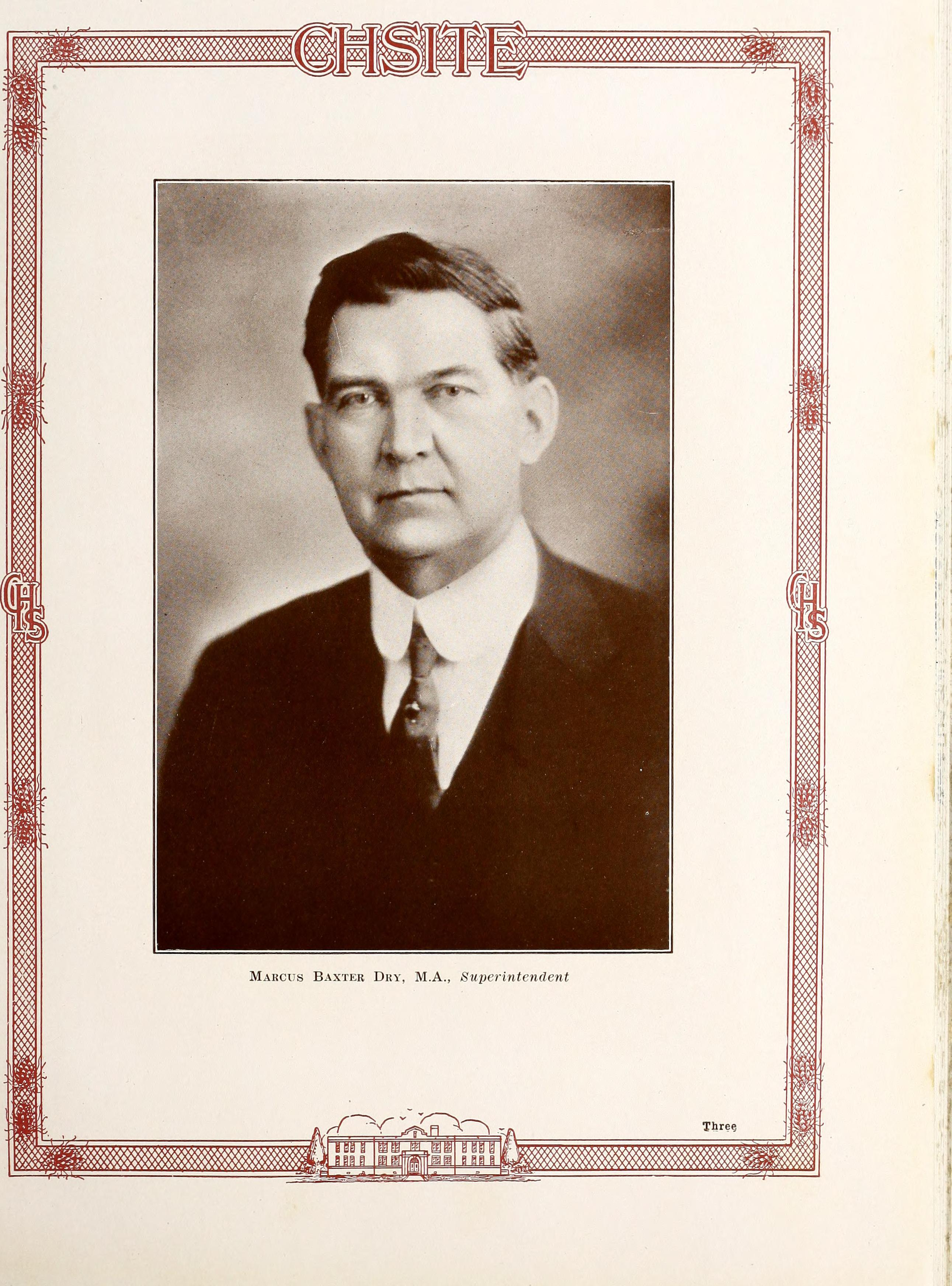
Marcus Baxter Dry, 1915

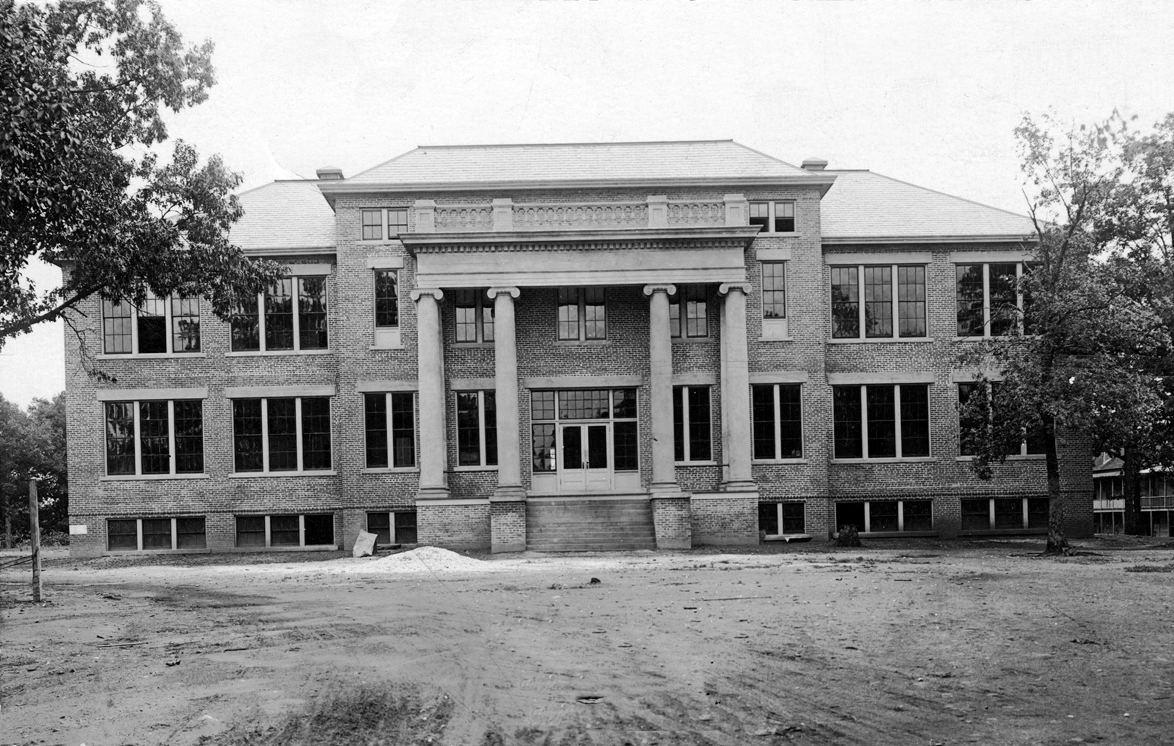
Cary High School 1915, considered the best high school building in North Carolina at the time.

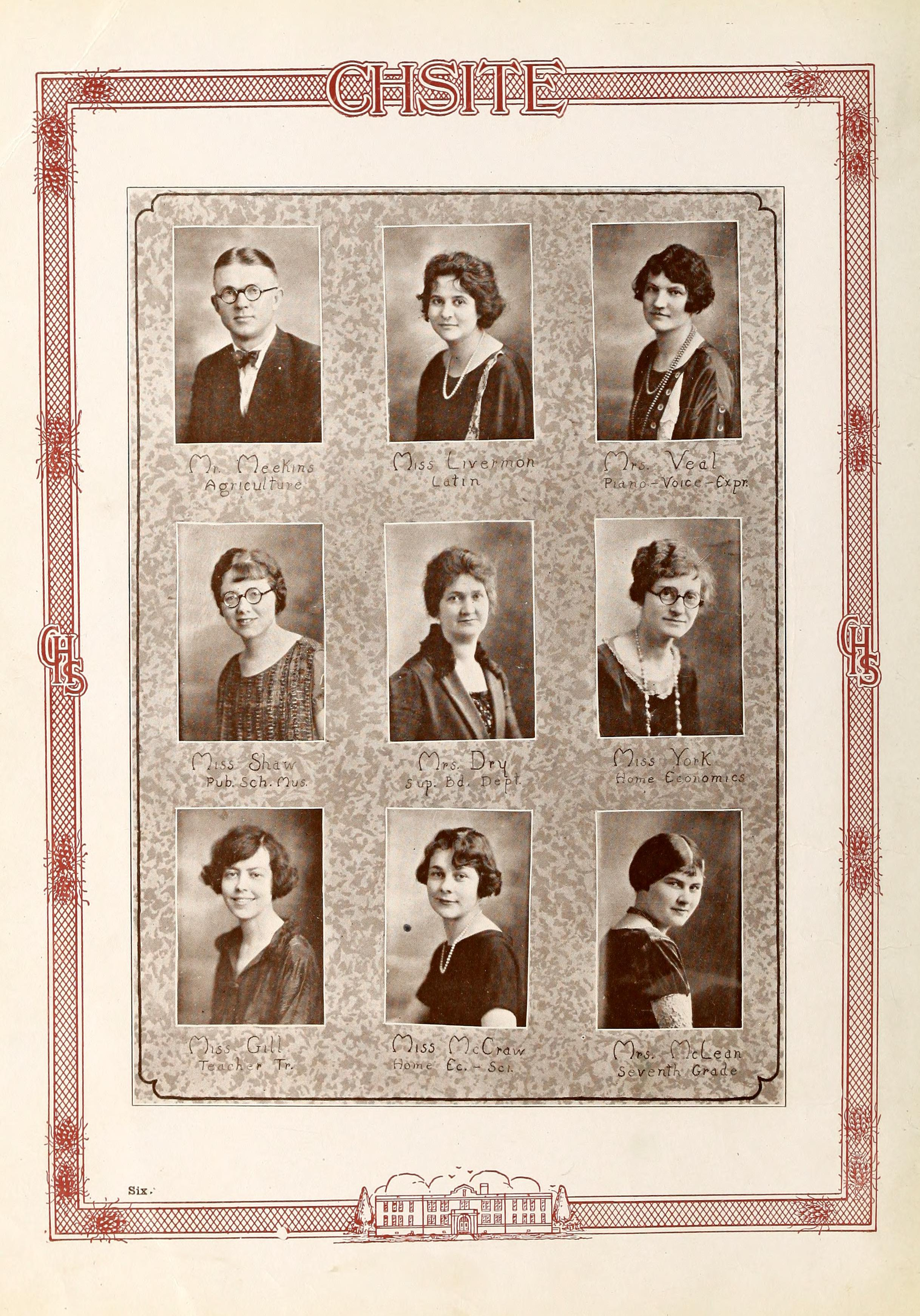
1915 Cary High School faculty

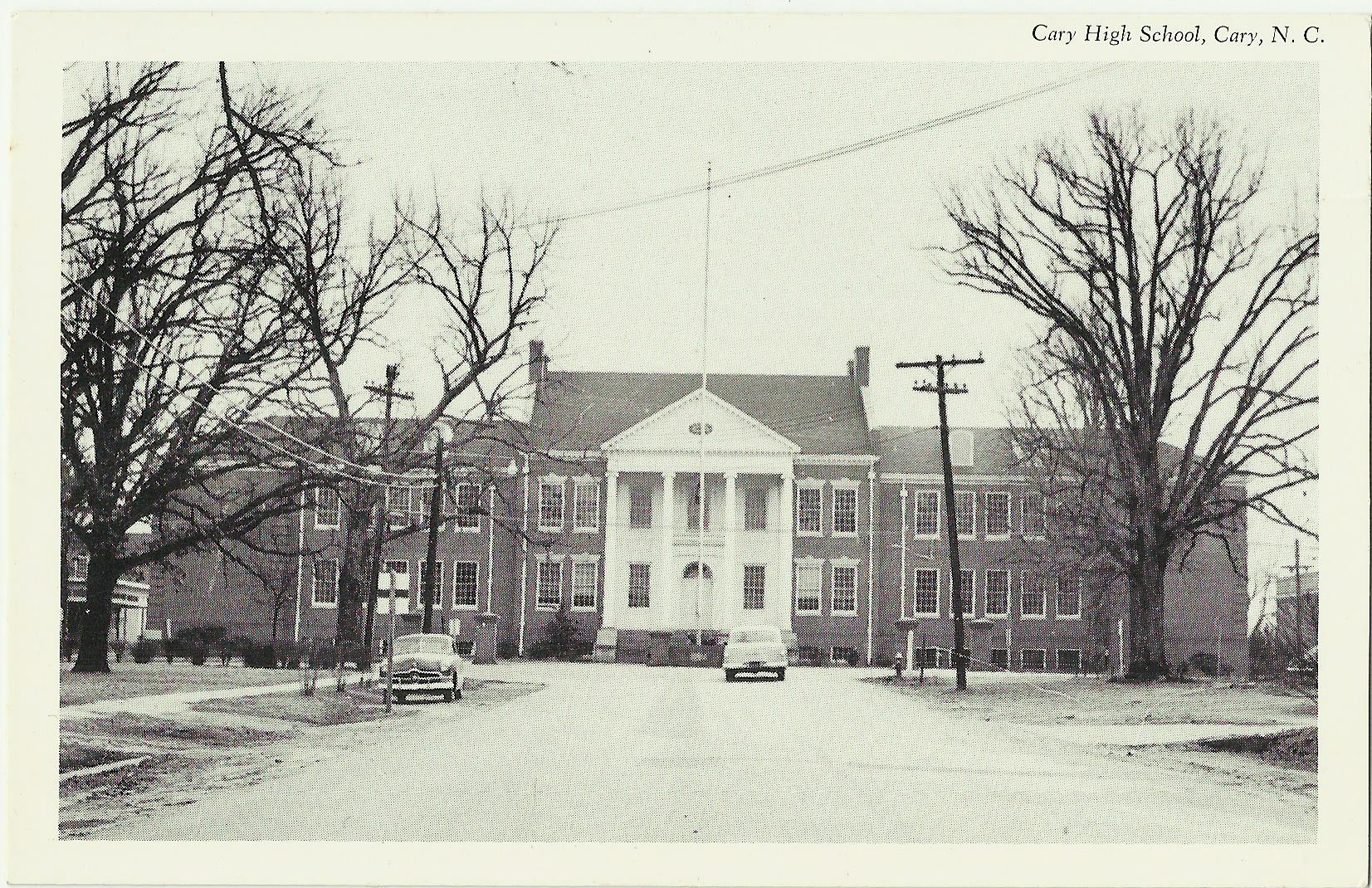
Cary High School, 1940s

In 1907, the North Carolina legislature approved a state-wide public education system. Eight days later on April 3, 1907, the board of directors of Cary High School sold it to the Wake County Board of Education for $2,750—its estimated value at the time was more than $8,000. Half of the purchase price was paid for by the State under the new legislation. Thus, Cary High School is the first county high school in North Carolina, the first state-funded high school in North Carolina, and the first high school in the state system. The school was managed by the Cary School Committee under the leadership of C. W. Scott, chair.

The State Legislature approved the establishment of a Cary School District and authorized a school tax for residents of the area. The Cary School Committee could charge up to 30¢ in school taxes for every $100 of real estate owned in the district. The citizens approved the tax in a referendum held on May 7, 1907. The outcome of the referendum was 100 in favor of the school tax and two against it. Those who lived outside the Cary School District could attend the high school for $14 a term for freshmen and sophomores and $16 a term for juniors and seniors.

Middleton remained as the school's principal during the transition, retiring in 1908. His replacement was superintendent Marcus Baxter Dry. The curriculum consisted of one year of French, three years of science, and four years of English, history, Latin, and mathematics. The latter included arithmetic, algebra, and geometry. Domestic science was added for female students in 1910. Students could add art, elocution, music, or piano to their studies for an added fee.

In the fall of 1912, 119 students enrolled in the high school. This number included eighty boarding students from other counties. The curriculum expanded to include agriculture, botany, and chemistry as science options. That year, the Girls Athletic Club was formed so that female students could play tennis and basketball.

By 1913, the student body had outgrown the campus. Dry asked the citizens of the school district to increase the school tax so that the school could have a new building with a modern heating system. In May 1913, the voters approved $25,000 in bonds for a new 33-room brick building to be placed on the site of the original wood frame building. The State contributed an additional $5,000 to construct what was considered "the best high school building in the state". Dry recalled, "It can truly be said that this building led the way for better high school buildings in North Carolina. Many delegations of school people from all over the State came to Cary to see this building, and many a building in the next few years was modeled after it."

In 1914, the school changed its name to Cary Public High School and Farm Life School to reflect an expanded curriculum that included vocational agriculture and home economics. The next year, fifteen acres on what is now Walnut Street were donated by James M. Templeton Jr. for hands-on learning in farming. An additional $1,500 was donated by others and the Town of Cary to add a barn, farmhouse, dairy cows, and other stock to the model farm. (The farmhouse survives at 510 Walnut Street.) Students enrolled in the agricultural program would arrive early to milk the cows; the milk was then served with breakfast at the school for boarding students.

In 1915, the Chsite yearbook premiered. In 1919, students organized a student council, a general athletic association, and The Echo campus newspaper. In 1921, a marching band was formed, and school colors of olive green and white were selected, along with the white rose as the school flower. The school motto was "service".

Also in 1920, Cary voters approve $45,000 in bonds for a new farm life department building. The result was Walter Hines Page Vocational Education Building which was completed in 1922. The next year, a State Normal Class for Teachers was started at Cary High School; this was one of four sites for this program in the state and it operated for five years. By 1924, students could receive either an academic, agriculture, home economics or teacher training diploma.

A new gymnasium, the James M. Templeton Physical Education Building, was added to the campus in 1925 at the cost of $12,000. The gym seated 500 people and allowed students to play basketball on a wooden court, rather than on dirt. By 1926, campus athletics included five organized sports—baseball, basketball, football, tennis, and track. Student clubs included the Boys Glee Club, the Dramatic Club, the Girls Glee Club, the Home Economics Club, four literary societies, and the Science Cub.

In 1926, the school acquired its first bus which traveled 24 miles a day for 22 students. Realizing the potential benefit of buses, the Wake County Board of Education expanded the Cary School District from the Raleigh City limits near the State Fairgrounds to the Durham County line in 1927. Busing allowed the county to consolidate schools in Morrisville, Reedy Creek, and Sorrell's Grove with Cary, closing the smaller locations. At the same time, the Board of Education allocated $38,000 to construct a new building for the Cary High School campus, and an additional $12,000 to update heating systems. The school also had a library with 1,970 volumes.

When the Great Depression hit Cary, property values dropped which reduced the school tax income. The Board of Education closed Mount Herman and Ebenezer schools, sending those students to Cary. The State legislature increased its funding which helped offset the loss of tax revenue, and eventually ended the local school tax altogether in 1933. However, there were still campus budget cuts such as no new books for the library and ceasing publication of the Chsite yearbook. The dormitories were also closed, ending the school's era of being a boarding school. At this time, grades 1 through 11 were taught at Cary High School under a consolidated school program. WPA funding allowed the school to expand its athletic fields by five acres. The community combined WPA funding, county funding, and local support to build what was then one of the finest football stadiums in North Carolina, with seating for 1,500 people.

The success of the football field project led to the collaborative funding of a new central school building, with the Board of Education providing $70,000 and the WPA providing the balance of the $132,000 cost of construction. The dedication stone of the new building read:

Cary High School

First State Public High School

Established in North Carolina on April 3, 1907

This building was erected in 1938.

However, the building was mostly constructed in 1939. The new three-story building included many modern features, such as a cafeteria, fire doors, a first aid room, an intercom system, a movie projector, a sound-proof typing room, and an auditorium with 834 seats. At the dedication ceremony on March 4, 1940, Governor Clyde Hoey said Cary was "a beacon of hope and inspiration to other communities of the State". The News and Observer wrote, "Cary High School and its predecessor, Cary Academy, has occupied a position of leadership in the field of secondary education, not only in Wake County but in the State as a whole for 75 years."

In 1941, Cary had the largest high school in Wake County, with 460 students. The next year, Dry retired after 34 years as principal. However, he then began teaching algebra in summer school. Thaddeus N. Frye became the new principal or superintendent. That same year, Wake County added the 12th grade to its curriculum, and the school year was extended from eight to nine months in 1943.

In 1956, Cary High School was the first school in Wake County to be accredited by the Southern Association of Secondary Schools. The next year, the Wake County Board of Commissioners purchased forty acres of land for $30,000 from Luther M. Maynard as a site for a new Cary High School. In 1958, 150 residents debate the proposed location with the Wake County Board of Education; while many liked the new site, others thought the property which was one mile from downtown was too far out in the country and lacked good road access.

However, plans went forward with construction at the new campus. The last graduating class to attend their senior year at the original campus was the Class of 1960; it was also the first class to have more than 100 graduating members. The original campus became Cary Junior High and Elementary School, then Cary Elementary School. On August 13, 2011, it opened as the Cary Arts Center.

=== Current campus ===
The new campus of Cary Senior High School opened on September 7, 1960, with new principal Samuel Arbes. The campus was filled to capacity when it opened with 573 students comprising the sophomore, junior, and senior classes. The campus consisted of three classrooms buildings, a gymnasium, a library, an auditorium, a cafeteria, and a shop building. Its architect was William A. Deitrick and the builder was J. M. Thompson Construction Company of Raleigh. The construction cost $771,251, with an additional $38,000 for design fees. By 1962, it was estimated that the high school needed ten more classrooms. The resulting building expansion allowed the student body to also include freshmen, starting in 1963. At this time, the school's name reverted to Cary High School.

Also in 1963, the Wake County Board of Education approved the voluntary transfer of six students from the all-black Berry O'Kelly School to Cary High School under the "freedom of choice" policy adopted by the board following the U.S. Supreme Court's decision on segregation. Cary the first school to be desegregated in Wake County outside of Raleigh (William G. Enloe High School being the first within the city of Raleigh). Board of Education member Ferd Davis recalled that Cary was specifically selected for integration because it was an area that was already rapidly changing and "would accept something new more readily". Some white parents sued the school system over the integration, and the suit was thrown out by the North Carolina Supreme Court.

These transfer students were seniors, Lucille Evans and Frances Louise White, juniors Gwendolyn Matthews and Brenda Lee Hill, sophomore Ester Lee Mayo, and freshman Phyllis Rose. These six African-American girls, chosen to be bright, outgoing, and "strong-willed enough to take what was inevitably coming to them", came to the school amid intense verbal opposition from whites. When the students arrived on campus, they were greeted by student protesters. Matthews recalls, "My parents…said it would get better, and it did. The demonstrations went on for ten days with fewer students participating each day. They were never more than fifty…and that's not many at a school the size of Cary". Evans and White graduated in 1964. That fall, Gregory Crowe became the first African American male student at Cary High School. In 1967, the Board of Education decided to integrate Cary High School by making the former black high school the 9th grade Junior High for all races, and transferring all black sophomores, juniors and seniors to what was again called Cary Senior High School. Under the scheme, the senior high school had 764 whites and 112 blacks, or a minority rate of 12.8%.

By 1972, the school was again overcrowded, resorting to the use of two mobile classrooms or trailers. When the school opened in the fall of 1973, there were more than 1,500 students, requiring the use of eight classroom trailers. In 1973, a county-wide bond referendum gave $700,000 to expand Cary High School. Construction began in May 1974 on an eight-classroom building to house foreign languages, a library expansion, an auto mechanics shop, a stadium field house, and a new lobby and expanded offices for Building A.

In 1989, a 4.5 million dollar school construction project brought more improvements to the school, such as the addition of Building 10 which included a new air-conditioned media center. This allowed freshmen to return to campus for the first time since the mid-1960s. However, in 1995 the school had some 1,800 students in a space designed for some 1,455 students. In 1996, there was a $3.44 million bond approved for school improvements, including a new classroom and administrative space, Building A renovations for the performing arts department, a career center, and computer labs—expanding the school's capacity to 1,585 students. Work also began on a new main entrance at the front of the school.

In 2004, plans by the architectural firm of Clark Nexsen were approved to renovate and expand campus facilities, including the construction of a new auditorium, gymnasium, music classrooms, and a new classroom building. Construction was completed by J. M. Thompson of Cary and the new three-story classroom building was opened in August 2008. As part of this project, the existing auditorium, band room, Building E, Building F and part of Building B were demolished. In total, 78,063 square feet were demolished, with 135,839 square feet being added, and 26,831 square feet being renovated.

In 2012, Clark Nexsen designed a master plan for Phase III of campus updates, including a dining addition and a 100,000-square-foot classroom. The project will be started when funding is in place.

== Student population ==
As of the 2021–22 academic year, Cary High School had 2.071 students. Of those students, 1,080 are male and 991 are female. The student population was 44.5% White, 27.5% Hispanic, 17.2% Black, 6% Asian, 4.4% two or more races, and 0.3% American Indian. The school's total minority population was 55.5%. 28% of Cary's students are economically disadvantaged, with 23% receiving a free lunch program and 4% participating in the reduced lunch program.

The student graduation rate is 87%. Based on test scores, 41.7% of the students are ready for college, above the district average of 37.8%.

== Faculty ==
In the academic year 2021–22, Cary High School had 120 teachers, with a student-teacher ratio of 17:1. The majority of the teachers, 97%, have been in their profession for three or more years and are also certified.

In addition, Cary has a student–counselor ratio of 299:1, better than the state average of 361:1. The faculty also includes a social worker.

In 2019, Nolan Bryant received a Maggie Award for Best High School Principal in Western Wake County. Track and cross country coach Jerry Dotson for also received a 2019 Maggie Award for Best High School Coach in Western Wake County.

== Academics ==
=== Curriculum ===
Cary High School includes grades 9 through 12. The school operates on a traditional calendar, with a block schedule.

The school offers Advanced Placement® courses, with 53% of students participating. In addition, 38% of the students passed at least one AP® Exam. 53% of the school's students take the SAT, with an average score of 1146. However 64% of the school's graduates pursue either college or vocational training. Students from Cary High School have received the Morehead-Cain Scholarship for the University of North Carolina at Chapel Hill and the John T. Caldwell Scholarship to North Carolina State University.

The school's Career & Technical Education Department's goal is to prepare students for employment. In addition to classroom learning, internships are also included for many students. The educational areas include agriculture; business, finance and marketing; career development; computer science and information technology; family and consumer sciences; health sciences; and trade, technology, engineering and industrial education.

Since the fall of 2022, Cary High School also includes The Academy of Technology and Advanced Manufacturing, an "immersive, smaller learning community within Cary High School". The academy is a four-year program that focuses on advanced manufactures, design, engineering, and technology. Cary High School invested more than $100,000 in electrical, electronic, instrumentation, pneumatic/flow control, and robotic equipment that incorporates current technologies.

=== Rankings ===
As of 2024, U.S. News & World Report ranks Cary High School 18th amongst the high schools in Wake County, North Carolina. It is also ranked 91st in North Carolina, and 3,446 in the nation. Niche gives the school an "A" rating and places the school at #95 in best public high schools in North Carolina.

=== Academic honors ===
Juniors and seniors with a 3.6 GPA can apply to join the National Honor Society. The top twenty juniors based on GPA rankings are selected to serve as Junior Marshalls for major senior class activities related to graduation. Before graduation each year, there is a reception for Honor Graduates and an Academic Awards Night. At graduation, Honor Students with a GPA of 3.75 or greater receive gold/silver/red tassels for their mortar board and a patch to add to their gown.

=== Library ===
The school's media center has a staff of two. Students have access to online databases as well as a physical book collection. The media center's website includes book reviews written by students and staff.

== Student life ==
=== Traditions ===
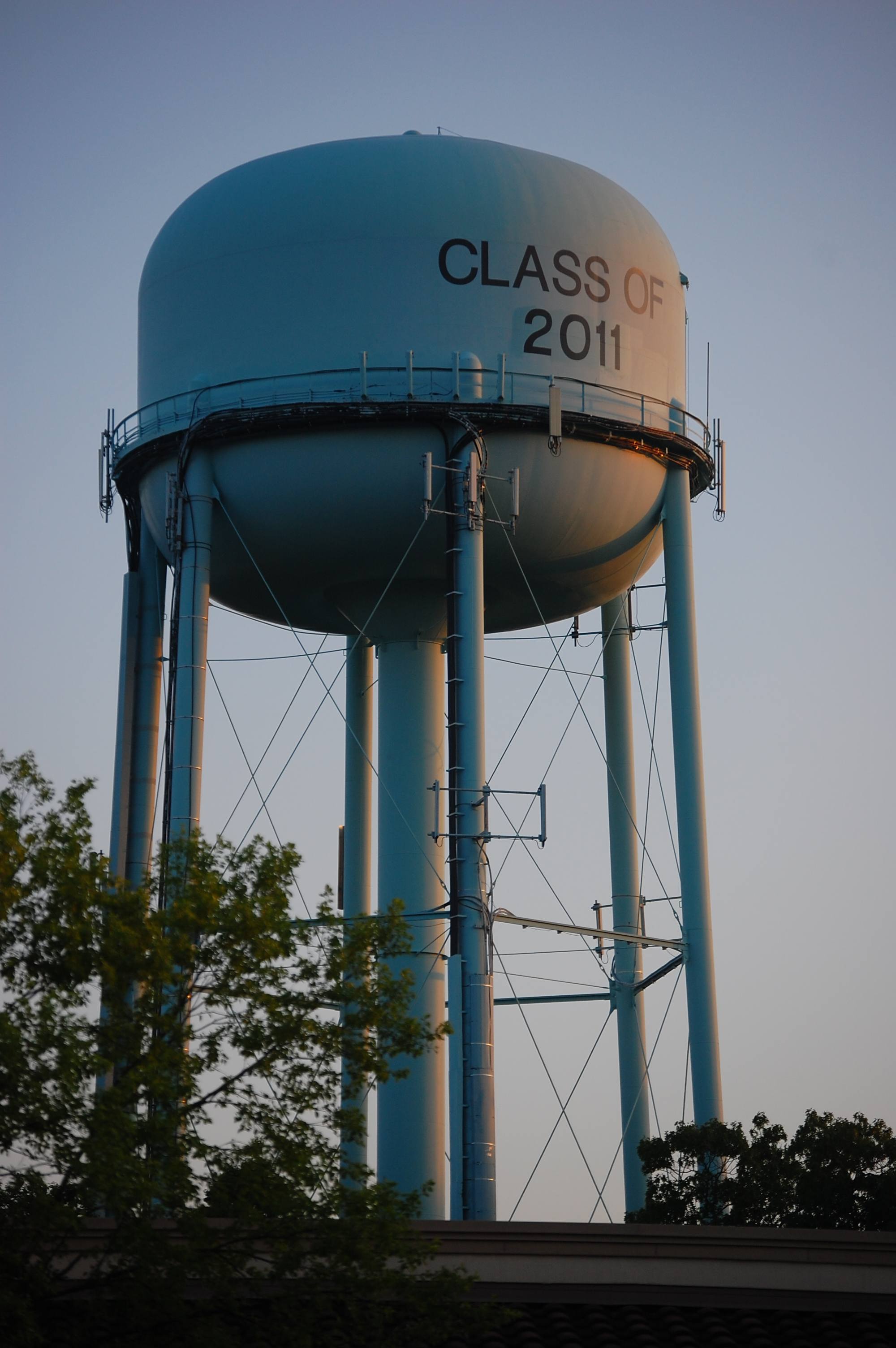
Water Tower painted for the Class of 2011

In 1960, the student council held a design contest for a school seal. The winning seal features pine cones and dogwood blossoms and the Latin phrase Cognito Vincit or Knowledge Conquers.

The Cary High School Alma Mater is sung to the tune of "Over the Summer Sea" or "La Donna e mobile" from the opera Rigoletto by Giuseppe Verdi. For more than fifty years, the school had the lyrics to the Alma Mater, but did not know the tune. Research finally revealed the tune and the song were performed by the Cary High Marching Band and Concert Chorus at a football game on October 22, 2021. Since then, the Alma Mater has been revised as a campus tradition.

Another school tradition involved members of the rising senior class painting their class year on the water tower across Maynard Road from the school before the start of the school year. Fearing for the safety of students, the Town of Cary took over painting the water tower for the Class of 1986. Locals pitched in to pay the professional painters. The Town of Cary has continued this tradition for decades.

=== Cary Band ===
The Cary High School Band, established in 1921, is a corps-style marching band that has "gained local, national, and international acclaim". In addition to the marching band, Cary also has three concert bands, a jazz ensemble, an indoor percussion ensemble, an indoor marching wind ensemble, and a symphony. The current director of bands is Brandon Martel. The band is supported by the Cary Band Boosters, a nonprofit corporation. The Cary Band hosts Cary Band Day, an annual festival featuring marching bands from the North Carolina and Virginia area since 1958.

In 1959, the band marched in Charlotte's Shrine Bowl Parade, Raleigh's Christmas Parade, and Wilmington's Azalea Festival Parade under the direction of James Johnson. Under the leadership of director Jack White, the band was selected to represent North Carolina at a national band festival in Sioux City, Iowa in 1963. In 1965, the band marched in the Governor Dan K. Moore's inaugural parade under the leadership of director A. J. Moore.

In 1972, the band entered and won the Sun-Fun Festival at Myrtle Beach, South Carolina, beating the national champs of Wilson High from Reading, Pennsylvania. Shortly afterward, the Cary High School band was listed in the top twenty nationally by Ruffles and Flourishes, a national band magazine. In January 1973 under the leadership of director Jimmy Burns, the Cary band was the first from North Carolina to march in the Tournament of Roses parade; the community raised $30,000 to send the band to Pasadena, California for the event. That year, the band also competed on a television show called Sounds of '73 that was emceed by Jerry Lewis and viewed twenty to thirty million people. The band also marched in the inaugural parades for Governor James Holshouser and for President Richard Nixon; they were one of ten bands at the latter event. On December 31, 1973 (televised January 1, 1974), the band marched in the King Orange Bowl Festival parade in Miami, Florida.

In August 1974, the Cary band performed at the Fêtes de Genève in Geneva, Switzerland—this honor is limited to only one band from the United States each year. The town celebrated Jimmy Burns Day, in honor of the band's director. In 1975, the band played at the Kentucky Derby, nation's first largest parade. On January 1, 1976, the Cary band was the first out-of-state band to march in the Cotton Bowl parade in Dallas, Texas. Later that year, the band attended the Pennsylvania Festival of the Colonies, winning the parade competition and coming in third overall.

In 1977, the band returned to the Tournament of Roses parade. In 1978, they participated in the week-long Festival of States in St. Petersburg, Florida. Under new director Don Stubblefield, they also marched in the Macy's Thanksgiving Day Parade in New York City and were seen by eighty million television viewers. In March 1980, the band toured Romania for two weeks as Friendship Ambassadors. In 1982, the band played for President Ronald Reagan when he attended a campaign event at the Raleigh Civic Center. Also in 1982, they were in the Gimbel's Thanksgiving Day parade in Philadelphia, Pennsylvania. In 1984, the band again played in the Tournament of Roses parade, becoming the first non-California band to participate in the parade three times. The band competed at the Citrus Bowl Music Festival in 1987, placing third overall. In 1989, the band marched in the inaugural parade for Governor James G. Martin and the San Diego Holiday Bowl Music Festival.

The band won the parade event at the Citrus Bowl Music Festival in 1991. In 1993, the band marched in the inaugural parade for Governor James B. Hunt. In 1996 under the leadership of director Tony Robinson, the band received fourteen of fifteen first-place awards at the Gator Bowl in Jacksonville, Florida, including the Grand Champions trophy for best in both parade and field show.

The band marched in the 2016 Macy's Thanksgiving Day Parade under the leadership of director Matt Minick.

=== Ambassadors Club ===
Ambassadors Club members "represent Cary High to new transfer students and to ninth graders as they transition into high school."

=== IDEA Club ===
The IDEA Club promotes student engagement and activism with government and politics. In March 2022, the club was involved in fighting censorship of books related to gender, sexuality, and race in the school's library. The IDEA Club also conducts voter registration drives.

=== NJROTC ===
In the fall of 1996, alumnus Del Richards donated $40,000 to start a Navy Junior Reserve Officers' Training Corps (NJROTC) program at the high school. NJROTC includes numerous competitive teams, including academics, athletics, drill, marksmanship, and physical fitness.

=== Performing Arts ===
Cary High School Performing Arts is an umbrella name for the school's choral group and drama club. The group typically produces a fall play and a spring choral concert. During the COVID-19 pandemic, students replaced live performances with videos that were edited by alumnus Michael Shorb and then streamed to audiences. Cary High School Performing Arts is supported by the nonprofit organization, Cary High School Performing Arts Booster Club.

=== Publications ===
The school's yearbook, YRAC, was first published in 1948; this was a revival of a prior publication that ceased during the Great Depression. In 1987, The Spirit student newspaper placed first at the American Scholastic Press Association Writing Contest under the leadership of advisor Janice Richardson. Other student-produced publications include The Page online student newspaper which was founded in 2018 by students Stephen Atkinson and Claire Perry.

=== Speech and Debate ===
The Speech and Debate team is a member of the Tarheel Forensics League (TFL) and competes statewide. Formed around 2010, the team finished second in a state-wide tournament its first year. The next year, the team finished in second place at the state championship and qualified for the National Speech and Debate Tournament. Since then, the team has competed at the national tournament seven of its first ten years. The team has also hosted local tournaments.

== Athletics ==
=== Mascot ===
Cary High School's mascot is the Imp. Albert H. Werner, football and baseball coach starting in 1935, was an influence in selecting the team mascot. Werner had played football at Duke University where the junior varsity teams were called the Blue Imps rather than the Blue Devils. Probably to balance college favorites, Cary's mascot was called the White Imp, incorporating the White Phantoms which were the mascot of the University of North Carolina at Chapel Hill at that time.

At first, just the football team was referred to as the White Imps, but the name eventually was used for all sports teams. After the 1971-72 school year, "white" was dropped to avoid racial connotations when the school was desegregated. The Imp is now green.

The current illustration of the Imp was designed by student Lee Mauney in the 1960s. Mauney later was the school's art teacher and athletic director. In January 2010, Cary premiered a costumed Imp mascot at the Cary vs. Apex High School basketball game. The mascot costume was purchased with donations and funds raised by student members of the Ambassador Club. The costume was produced by Stagecraft in Cincinnati, Ohio.

ESPN selected the Cary Imp as one of the best nicknames for a football team in the country in 2009. The Imp was also recognized as the fourth most unique high school nickname in the country by Sports Illustrated in 2010. In 2023, the Cary Imp was voted as the best high school mascot in the country in the Sports Illustrated High School Fan National annual competition.

=== School Colors ===
Historically, the school's colors were olive green and white. Today, Cary High School's colors are Kelly green and white.

=== Rivalries ===
Cary's historic rival was Garner High School—The New and Observer noted it "was as intense a rivalry as there was". As the community grew and part of the school's students were sent to the new Apex High School, this became the biggest rival.

=== Sports teams ===
Cary is a member of the North Carolina High School Athletic Association (NCHSAA) and are currently classified as a 7A school. The school is a part of the Triangle Six 6A/7A Conference.

The school has the following co-ed sports teams: cheerleading, junior varsity cheerleading, cross country, indoor track, track, and swim and dive. Sports teams for women include varsity basketball, junior varsity basketball, golf, gymnastics, lacrosse, junior varsity lacrosse, varsity soccer, junior varsity soccer, varsity softball, junior varsity softball, stunt, tennis, varsity volleyball, and junior varsity volleyball.

Men's sports teams include varsity baseball, junior varsity baseball, basketball, junior varsity basketball, varsity football, junior varsity football, golf, lacrosse, junior varsity lacrosse, varsity soccer, junior varsity soccer, tennis, and wrestling.

==== Football ====
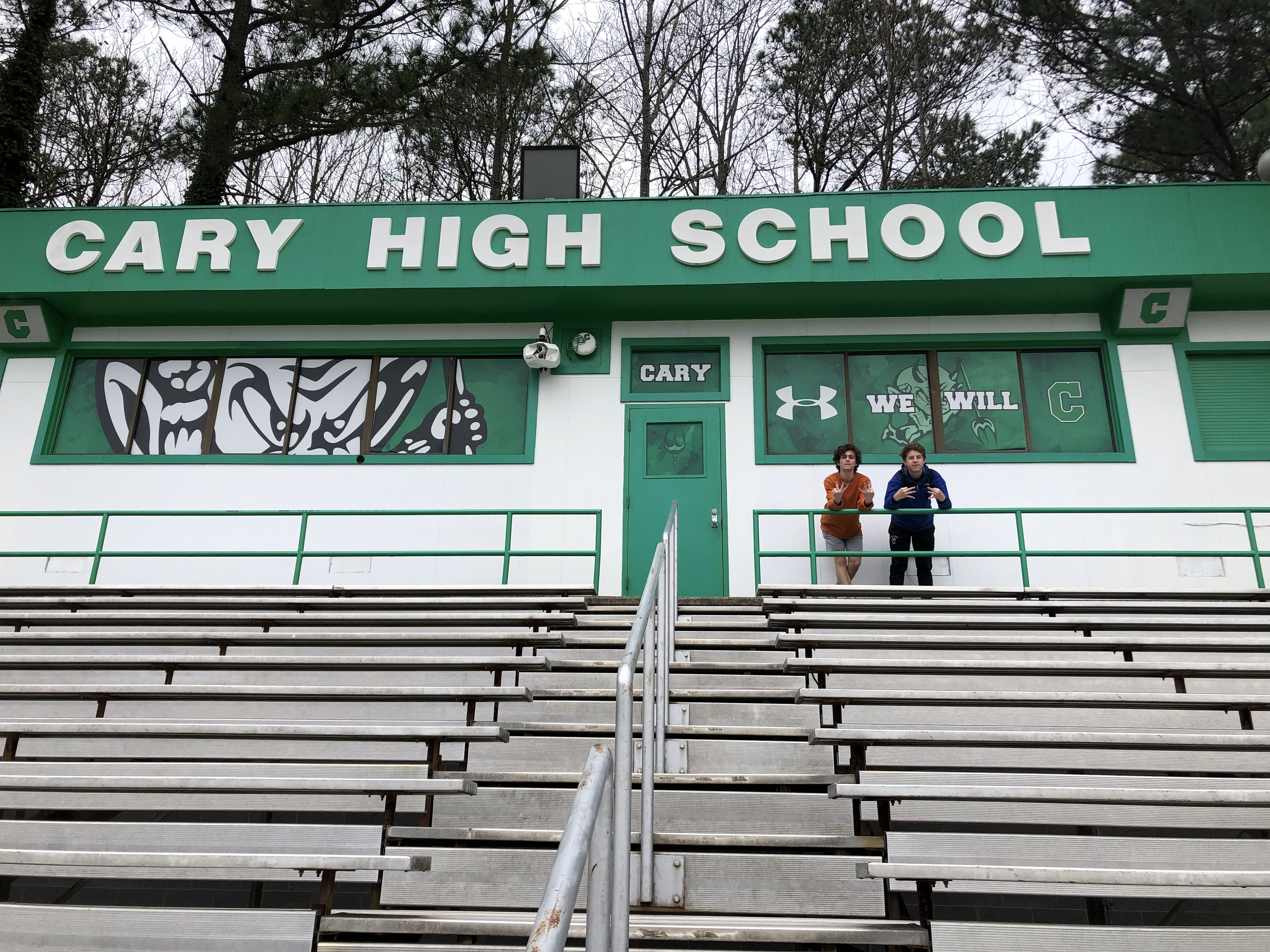
Cary High students pose next to press box in football stadium

Cary High School's first football team was organized in 1917. The coach was Tal Stafford who was previously a North Carolina A&M (now North Carolina State University) football star and All American. Probably because of World War I and the closing of the school during the influenza epidemic, the football team disbanded. It was reorganized in 1923. In 1935, Albert H. Werner, a former player at Duke University, became the football and coach.

In 1955 under coach John Ebby, the football team was undefeated, winning the Class A state championship. Players included fullback John Yarborough and quarterback Charles Maison who was later an All-American at Elon College.

On September 15, 1961, the football field on the new campus was dedicated as the Paul W. Cooper Athletic Field. In 1970, the Imps Booster Club announced it would raise $100,000 to expand Cooper Field to include locker rooms, restrooms, showers, and expanded seating. In 1973, a press box was added. In October of that year, A. E. Finley donated $15,000 toward the stadium's debt. As a result, the facility is renamed Cooper Field at A. E. Finley Stadium. In 1982, the press box was replaced for $29,500.

In 1976, Cary won the conference title with a record of 6-1 for coach Dave Riggs' final season. The team won the first round of the playoffs but then lost to undefeated Richmond County High School. This was Cary's best season until 1995. In the 1995-96 year, the team was undefeated under coach Bill Devine. Winning the conference title, the team had only allowed 45 points during their regular season. Although winning their first playoff game, the team did not make it to the finals. However, in this season, Cary's football team had the second-longest winning streak in the school's history, tied the school records for wins, and set school records for most points scored in a season and most interceptions.

==== Wrestling ====
Under the leadership of coach Jerry Winterton from 1981 to 2010, the wrestling team won 19 state championships (11 state tournament and 8 dual teams state titles), 21 regional championships, and 28 conference tournament championships. In 1987, the team was ranked 25th in the nation by Amateur Wrestling News and was also featured on ESPN's Scholastic Sports America. In 1988, the team was ranked as high as 11th in the nation. In 1990, the wrestling team's consecutive match win streak record ended at 188 wins.

Including the dual team state playoffs, the Imps had a dual meet record of 621–16 under Winterton from 1981 to 2010. Of those 16 dual meet losses, only three occurred during the regular season and the other thirteen occurred during the NCHSAA 4A dual team state playoffs. From 1981 to 2010, Winterton would also coach many individual state champions, as well as wrestlers who would earn All-American and National Champion honors.

Winterton was inducted into the Cary High School Hall of Fame in 1995, the North Carolina Chapter of the National Wrestling Hall of Fame in 2004, the North Carolina High School Athletic Association (NCHSAA) Hall of Fame in 2014, the National High School Hall of Fame (NFHS) in 2017, and the North Carolina Sports Hall of Fame in 2026.

==== Hall of Fame ====
In 1994, the first class was inducted into the Cary High School Hall of Fame. Inductees have either played, coached or served the athletic program of Cary High School.

==== State Championships ====
NCHSAA State Championships
Sport	Year(s)
Men's Basketball	1939 (Class B), 1954 (Class A), 1995 (4A)
Women's Basketball	1993 (4A)
Men's Cross Country	2018 (4A)
Women's Cross Country	1997 (4A)
Football	1955 (Class A)
Men's Soccer	1998 (4A)
Men's Outdoor Track & Field	2019 (4A)
Wrestling Dual Team	1993 (4A), 1996 (4A), 1997 (4A), 1998 (4A), 2005 (4A), 2007 (4A), 2008 (4A), 2009 (4A), 2018 (4A)
Wrestling State Tournament Team	1977 (All Classes), 1987 (4A), 1988 (4A), 1989 (4A), 1997 (4A), 2000 (4A), 2003 (4A), 2005 (4A), 2006 (4A), 2007 (4A), 2008 (4A), 2009 (4A)

== Notable people ==
=== Alumni ===
- John Altschuler, television and film writer and producer
- Debbie Antonelli, sports commentator
- Reggie Barnes, former pro-skateboarder and founder/owner of Eastern Skateboard Supply
- Chris Castor, former NFL wide receiver
- William C. Creel, former North Carolina Commissioner of Labor
- Carter Cruise, DJ, producer, model, and adult film actress
- John Custer, Grammy Award-nominated record producer and musician
- Ben Fountain, author
- Linda Hinkleman Gunter, former member of the North Carolina Senate and president of the North Carolina Electoral College
- Vance Heafner, professional golfer who played on the PGA Tour
- DJ Horne, college basketball player
- Andrew Hubner, author
- Greg Jones, MLB player
- Scott Kooistra, former NFL offensive tackle
- Roderick Perry II, former NFL nose tackle
- Justin Ress, competitive swimmer, represented the United States at the 2017 World Aquatics Championships
- Anthony Rush, former NFL defensive tackle
- Mark Scalf, college baseball coach, head coach of UNC Wilmington baseball from 1992–2019
- Zack Schilawski, former professional soccer player
- Vic Sorrell, former MLB pitcher, 1935 World Series champion with the Detroit Tigers
- Azurá Stevens, WNBA basketball player

=== Faculty ===
- Linda Gunter, teacher: former member of the North Carolina Senate and president of the North Carolina Electoral College
- Phil Spence, basketball coach: former NBA player and member of the NC State Wolfpack men's basketball national championship team
- Tal Stafford, football coach: head football coach at North Carolina State University
