= Tal Stafford =

American athlete, coach, and college athletics administrator

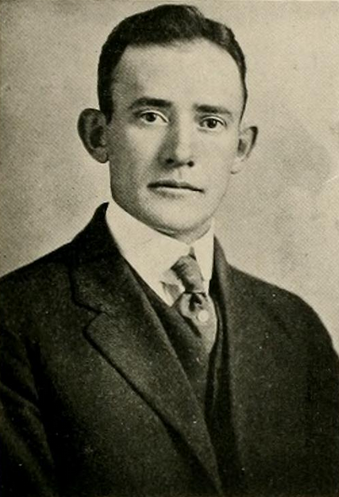
- Stafford pictured in The Agromeck 1919, NC State yearbook

Biographical details
- Born: January 7, 1890; Raleigh, North Carolina, U.S.
- Died: May 24, 1967 (aged 77); St. Petersburg, Florida, U.S.

Playing career

Football
- 1909–1911: North Carolina A&M

Baseball
- 1909–1912: North Carolina A&M
- 1912: Ashville Moonshiners
- 1913: Middlesboro Colonels
- Positions: Quarterback, end (football); Pitcher (baseball)

Coaching career (HC unless noted)

Football
- 1917: NC State (assistant)
- 1918: NC State

Basketball
- 1918–1919: NC State

Baseball
- 1918: NC State (assistant)
- 1919: NC State

Administrative career (AD unless noted)
- 1918–1920: NC State

Head coaching record
- Overall: 1–3 (football); 11–3 (basketball); 12–11 (baseball)

Talmage Holt "Tal" Stafford (January 7, 1890 – May 24, 1967) was an American football and baseball player, coach of football, basketball, and baseball, and college athletics administrator. He served as the head football coach at North Carolina State University in 1918, compiling a record of 1–3. Stafford was also head basketball coach at NC State that same academic year, 1918–19, tallying a mark of 11–3, and the baseball coach at the school in the spring of 1919, amassing a record of 12–11.

He was also the founding coach of the Cary High School football team in Cary, North Carolina.

== Head coaching record ==
=== Football ===
Year	Team	Overall	Conference	Standing	Bowl/playoffs
NC State Aggies (South Atlantic Intercollegiate Athletic Association) (1918)
1918	NC State	1–3	0–1	T–6th	
NC State:		1–3	0–1		
Total:		1–3			

=== Baseball ===
Record table
Season	Team	Overall	Conference	Standing	Postseason
NC State Wolfpack (Independent) (1919–1919)
1919	NC State	12–11			
NC State:		12–11			
Total:		12–11			
