= Bond Park =

Public park in Cary, North Carolina, US

Fred G. Bond Metro Park
- Bond Park
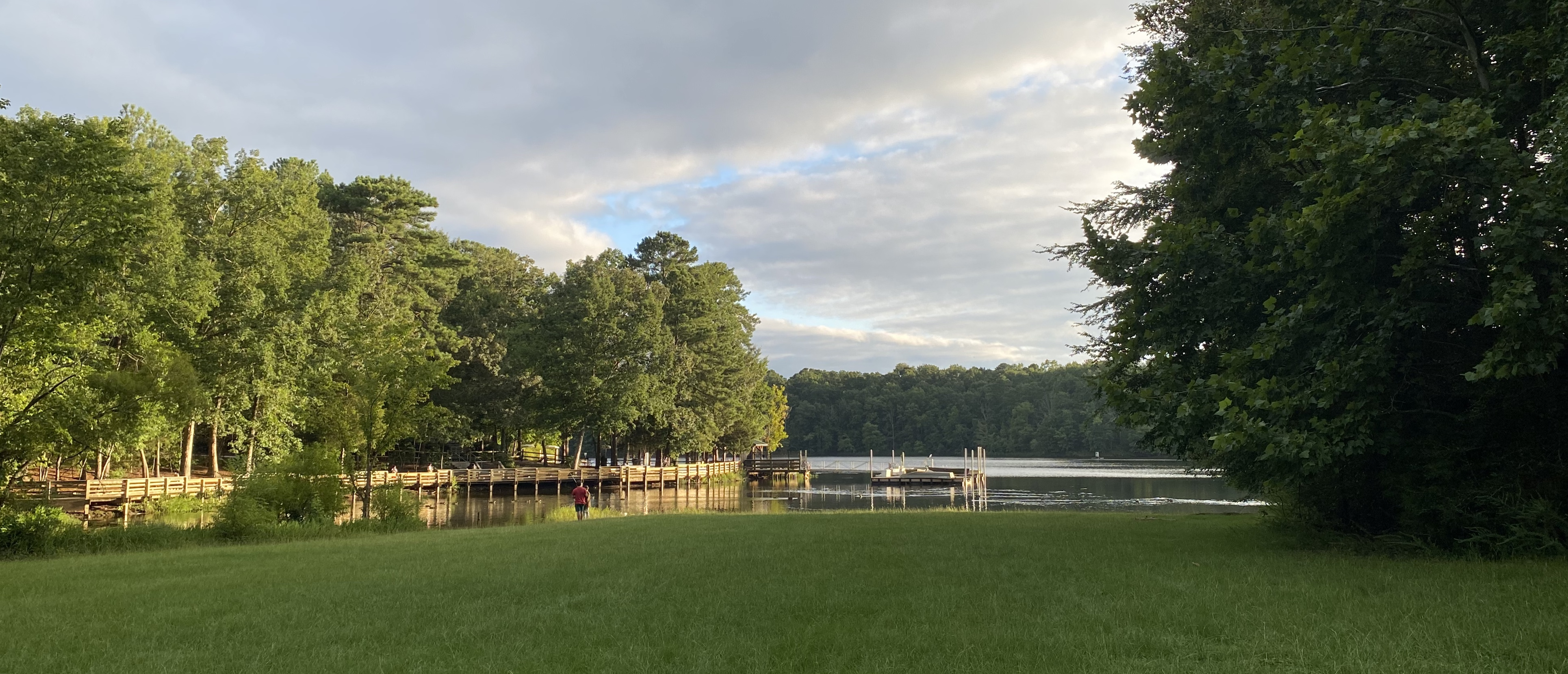
- The waterfront from the multi-purpose field.
- Interactive map of Fred G. Bond Metro Park
- Type: Municipal
- Location: 801 High House Road, Cary, North Carolina
- Coordinates: 35°46′54″N 78°49′27″W
- Area: 310 acres (130 hectares)
- Elevation: 367 feet (112 meters)
- Opened: 1985
- Owner: Town of Cary
- Operator: Cary Parks and Recreation
- Awards: Triangle J Award for Landscape
- Hiking trails: Black Creek Greenway Greenway Trail; Hiking Trail; Lake Trail; Oxxford Hunt Greenway; Paw Paw Trail; Pinecone Trail; Tree ID Trail White Oak Greenway
- Water: Bond Lake
- Parking: Free
- Facilities: Athletic fields Boat House and waterfront Buehler Shelter; Bond Park Community Center; Cary Senior Center; Compost Education Center; Kiwanis Shelter; Lazy Daze Playground; Preston Soccer fields Rope Course Sertoma Amphitheatre
- Website: Bond Metro Park

Fred G. Bond Metro Park is the largest municipal park in Cary, North Carolina. It is also one of the largest municipal parks in Wake County. It is located at 801 High House Road, physically the geographic center of the town. The park has been described as "an oasis in the middle of Cary".

== History ==
The park was originally the buffer zone and a water reservoir, created by an earth dam on Crabtree Creek in 1970. The dam is owned by the Town of Cary and was designed by the United States Department of Agriculture's Natural Resources Conservation Service.

In 1981, the property was named after Fred Bond who served on Cary's Town Council for eighteen years and was mayor of from 1971 to 1983. Cary developed the $7 million park which opened on May 31, 1985. The Fred G. Bond Metro Park was dedicated on June 1, 1985. At that time, it featured 3 mi (4.8 km) of trails, three baseball fields, two shelters, and a boathouse. The children's play area, auditorium, boat docks, and other athletic fields were still under construction. In 1985, the Triangle J Council of Governments gave the park a Triangle J Award in the category of landscape/institutional.

In 1986, the Parkway housing development donated 27 acres (11 ha) to the town for Bond Park. This additional acreage was on the northwest side of the park and consisted of open space. The developer committed to donate an addition 32 acres (13 ha) once their development was completed.

During the winter months of January 2016 to January 2020, repair works were undertaken on the Fred G. Bond Dam on Bond Lake.

== Description ==
Bond Metro Park has 310 acres (130 ha) of recreational space, all in a natural setting. It includes an amphitheater, a community center, hiking trails, a lake with a boathouse, the Lazy Daze playground, picnic shelters, restrooms, a senior center, a challenge rope course, two soccer fields, and seven fields for baseball and softball.

=== Activities ===
The park hosts a range of events on weekends and holidays, including kite flying, fishing contests, lakeside movies, pickleball tournaments, plant swaps, Earth Day celebrations, and Pedal Boats and Soda Floats. In the winter, there is sledding hill when it snows, plus snow tubes with manufactured snow. The park offers a basic orienteering course, compost education, a Tree ID Trail, and the Pokémon Go game. The park's largest event is the Spring Daze Arts and Crafts Festival which features 175 artists, four stages for performing artists, and food.

The Sertoma Amphitheatre is an outdoor stage that seats 350 spectators. Its stage showcases local acts such as the Triangle Brass Band.

The park was a site for COVID-19 testing in 2021.

=== Bond Lake and Boathouse ===
The 42 acres (0.17 km^{2}) Bond Lake is a man-made freshwater lake open to fishing and boating. The lake was created in 1970 when the Crabtree Creek W/S Structure #3, now known as the Fred. G. Bond Dam, was built on Crabtree Creek. It is stocked by trout by the North Carolina Wildlife Commission.

The park's Boathouse & Waterfront features a 200-foot boardwalk, concessions, a screen porch overlooking the forest, fishing access, a small beach for launching kayaks, and rentals of canoes, kayaks, pedal boats, rowboats, and sailboats. The Boathouse provides the required life jackets and sells cane poles and bait. The lake is governed by North Carolina's Fishing Regulations which requires a valid fishing license for individuals ages 16 and older who want to fish. Classes are taught in canoeing, kayaking, and sailing for all ages.

=== Buildings ===
Within Bond Park, is the 16,000 sq ft (1,500 m^{2}) Cary Senior Center which is "designed to promote active retirement years." It features a variety of activities, including arts, fitness classes, recreation activities, technology education, an annual health fair, and volunteer opportunities.

The 29,000 sq ft (2,700 m^{2}) Bond Park Community Center, has classrooms, rental space, a gym, and courts for badminton, basketball, pickleball and volleyball. Cary Parks and Recreation hosts a variety of programs ranging from arts to history.to esports and day camp.

=== Public art ===
The "Fred Bond Bust" is a bronze sculpture that is installed adjacent to the Bond Park Boathouse. In 1998, artist Carl Reguitti created this artwork which is part of Cary's public art collection. There is also a gallery with changing art exhibits inside the Bond Park Community Center.

=== Trails ===
The park's most popular feature is its 4.2 mi (6.8 km) of trails, including Black Creek Greenway, Lake Trail, Oxxford Hunt Greenway, Paw Paw Trail, Pine Cone Trail, and White Oak Greenway. The 2.1 mi (3.4 km) Lake Trail is the longest of the six, and circles Bond Lake in a natural wooded setting with both paved and unpaved sections. This "easy and picturesque hike" is popular with walkers, mountain bikers, joggers, and bird watchers.

Bond Park is part of a town-wide trail expansion plan, which makes the park a hub of several trails, connecting it to the Crabtree Creek Greenway and the Swift Green Greenway, which in turn will connect the park to the American Tobacco Trail and Umstead State Park. The new expansions are highly controversial with local residents.

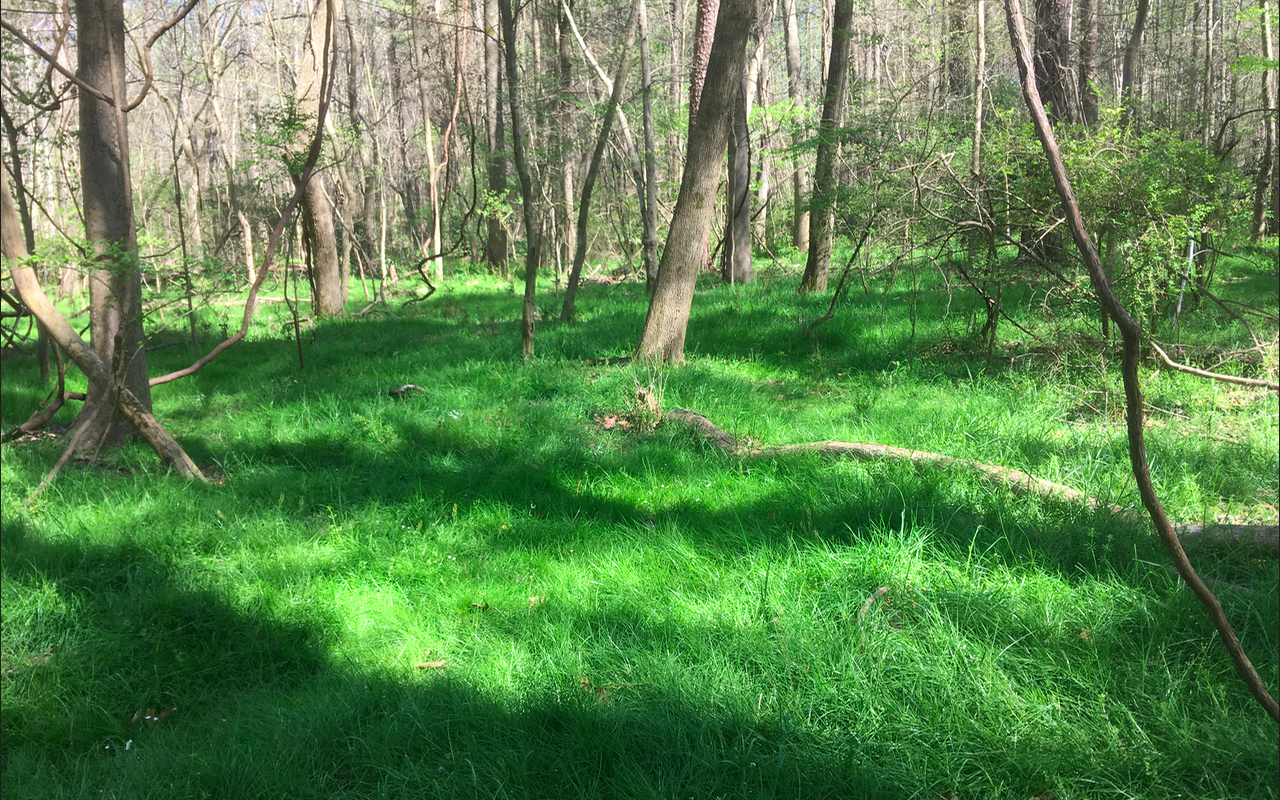
Bond Park

== Animals ==
=== Domestic ===
Dogs are allowed in Bond Park but must be on a leash no longer than six feet. Dogs are not allowed on rental boats. The Dog Days of Cary is an annual event for pet owners and their dogs where dogs can get baths, vaccinations, or microchips. There are food vendors and also rescue organizations with animals looking for a new home. During Dogs Days of Cary, dogs are allowed on pedal boats.

=== Wildlife ===
In the summer of 2011, Cary began having problems with beavers at Bond Lake. The beavers flooded an area on the southeast side of the lake by building a dam. There was a public outcry when the town tried trapping the beavers. The town tried destroying the beaver's dam; however, the animals would just rebuild. The town tried poking holes in the dam; the beavers filled the holes with mud. In 2012, the town implemented new technology, a flow control device that would let water through the dam without the running water sound that causes the beavers to make repairs.

Bond Park offers regular classes in birding, helping people learn how to identify the many birds that can be found in the park's various habitats In the Great Backyard Bird Count of 2019, spotters counted 32 species in the park. Hermit thrushes, pine warblers, and yellow bellied sapsuckers can be spotted in the woodland areas. At the edges of the woods, birdwatches can spot Carolina chickadees, brown headed nuthatches, and white breasted nuthatches. The meadows are home to eastern bluebirds, eastern phoebes, white throated sparrows, and yellow rumped warblers, while the wetland areas bring belted kingfishers, red shouldered hawks and winter wrens. Double crested cormorants, pied billed grebes, and ruddy ducks like Bond Lake. Eddie Owens, who teaches “Bird Walks in Bond Park," says bald eagles are spotted several times a week near the lake. Other birds in the park include brown creepers, cedar waxwings, crows, golden crowned kinglets, the great horned owl, northern cardinals, and pine siskens.

In 2018, the park posted signs asking people not to feed the ducks and Canada geese at Bond Lake. Experts say that bread unhealthy for the waterfowl, and regular feedings attract unusually large populations that can overwhelm the lake's ecosystem with the bird's fecal matter. Sam Trogdon, senior operations and program supervisor at Bond Park, said, "Bread is not part of a bird’s diet so it just gives them diarrhea."
