= Chris Castor =

American football player (born 1960)

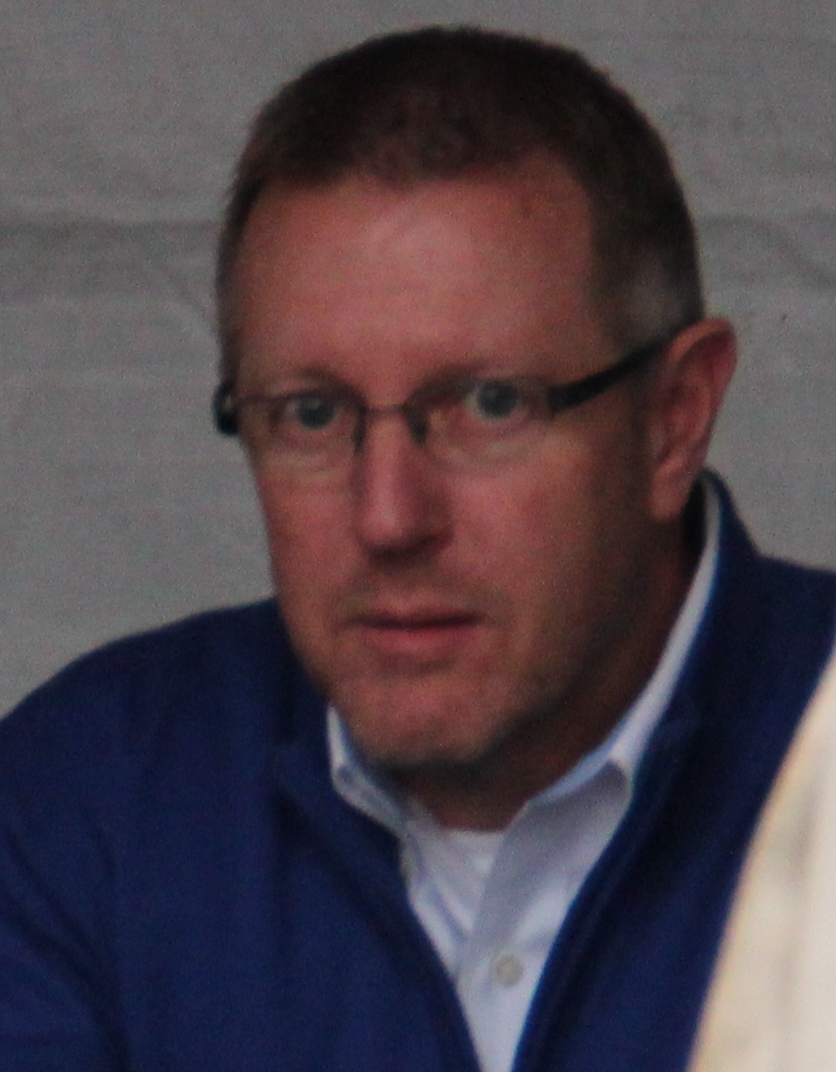
- Castor in 2014

No. 83
- Position: Wide receiver

Personal information
- Born: April 13, 1960 (age 66); Burlington, North Carolina, U.S.
- Listed height: 6 ft 0 in (1.83 m)
- Listed weight: 170 lb (77 kg)

Career information
- High school: Cary (Cary, North Carolina)
- College: Duke (1978–1982)
- NFL draft: 1983: 5th round, 123rd overall pick

Career history
- Seattle Seahawks (1983–1984)

Awards and highlights
- Second-team All-American (1982); First-team All-ACC (1982); ACC Player of the Year (1982); ACC All-Time Football Legends (2014)

Career NFL statistics
- Receptions: 8
- Receiving yards: 89
- Stats at Pro Football Reference

Christopher David Castor (born April 13, 1960) is an American former professional football player who was a wide receiver for the Seattle Seahawks of the National Football League (NFL). Castor also played college football for the Duke Blue Devils and was named to the 2014 ACC Football Legends Class. He is known as one of the fastest players of his time.

== Early life ==
Castor was born in Burlington, North Carolina, but grew up in Cary, North Carolina, where he graduated from Cary High School in 1978. He played football at both West Cary Junior High School and Cary High School, as well as track at Cary High School where he excelled at high hurdles, long jump, and sprinting.

== Duke University ==
Castor received a football scholarship for Duke University where he established the single-season record for average yards per reception (20.70) in 1982, He also caught 46 passes for 952 yards and 13 touchdowns during his senior year at Duke, becoming the ACC Player of the Year and a second-team All-America selection by the Associated Press.

Castor also competed on the Duke Blue Devils track and field team. He earned All-American status by running the 400 m leg of their 4th-place distance medley relay team at the 1981 NCAA Indoor Track and Field Championships.

== Professional career ==
In the 1983 USFL Draft, Castor was a fifth round selection of Tampa Bay Bandits. Although Tampa Bay offered him $35,000 a year with a $10,000 signing bonus, Castor decided to wait for the NFL draft and did not sign. During the NFL Draft, Castor was selected in the fifth round by the Seattle Seahawks.

Castor played for the Seahawks for the 1983 and 1984 seasons. In 1985, he was placed on reserve because of a broken clavicle. He retired from professional football in 1986, expressing desire to coach.

== Honors ==
In 1994, Castor was inducted into the Cary High School Imps' Hall of Fame for football and track. His high school football number, 86, was retired by the school in 1997 as part of their 75th football anniversary.

In 2014, the Atlantic Coast Conference named Castor to the All-Time ACC Football Legends.

== Personal life ==
Castor currently lives in Cary, N.C. and is the Director of Facility Services with SAS Institute.
