= Linda Hinkleman Gunter =

American politician

North Carolina Senate 36th District
- In office 1993–1998

Personal details
- Born: c. 1951 New York. U.S.
- Party: Democratic
- Profession: high school teacher

Linda Hinkleman Gunter (born circa 1951) is an American politician and educator.

== Early life, ==
Gunter was born in New York state to parents Helen and Walter Norman Hinkleman. The family moved to Cary, North Carolina in 1965 so her father could work for IBM in the nearby Research Triangle Park. She graduated from Cary High School in 1967.

== Career ==
Gunter was a social studies teacher at Cary High School from 1971 to 2002. She was known for encouraging civic involvement by her students.

In 1988, she received $1,000 along with the John Stevens Excellence in Teaching Award from the Wake Education Foundation.

In the fall of 1991, her classes began the Adopt-A-GI project in which students corresponded with local soldiers serving in the Gulf War. Two years later, the project resulted in a student-generated book.

== Politics ==
In 1992, Gunter was elected to the North Carolina Senate, representing the 36th district, as a member of the Democratic Party. In 1998, she had an unsuccessful run for the North Carolina House District 62.

In 2004, she campaigned for presidential candidate John Edwards in North Carolina and New Hampshire.

She was a member and president of North Carolina's Electoral College delegation during the 2008 presidential election. In 2019, she served North Carolina Democratic Party's State Executive Committee. She was also president of the Democratic Women of Wake County.

== Professional affiliations ==
Governor Roy Cooper appointed Gunter to the Teachers and State Employees Retirement System Board of Trustees in 2018 and 2019. She served as the vice president of the North Carolina Retired State Personnel in 2019. From 2005 to 2015, she was also the North Carolina Association of Educators (NCAE) UniServ Director and Government Relations Specialist. She also served as the vice president of Wake NCAE and president of Wake Retired School Personnel.

== Personal life ==
Gunter was married and has a son named Tracy Gunter and a daughter named Jamye Gunter. She was president of the South Raleigh Civitan Club.
