= Chop Shop (novel) =

2004 crime novel by Tim Downs

- Author: Tim Downs
- Language: English
- Genre: Thriller Novel
- Publisher: Howard Books
- Publication date: 2004
- Publication place: United States
- Media type: Print (Paperback)
- Pages: 352 pp
- ISBN: 978-1-58229-401-8
- OCLC: 55847356
- Dewey Decimal: 813/.6 22
- LC Class: PS3604.O954 C47 2004
- Preceded by: Shoofly Pie
- Followed by: First the Dead

Chop Shop is a 2004 crime novel by American writer and speaker Tim Downs. It was published in 2004 by Howard Books and was preceded by Shoofly Pie.

== Plot ==
This thriller features Nick “Bug Man” Polchak, a forensic entomologist who deduces clues to murders based on evidence left by insects on the victims. Dr. Riley McKay of the Allegheny County coroner's office becomes suspicious while analyzing several corpses. She asks Polchak for help, who discovers that a Pittsburgh-based black market in transplant organs seems to be fronted by PharmaGen, a genetics company with interests other than DNA.

== Origin ==
Chop Shop is the second in a series of Christian suspense novels featuring “Bug Man” Polchak.
