= Sun Fun Festival =

Annual event in South Carolina, US

Coordinates: 33.693°N 78.878°W

The Sun Fun Festival of Myrtle Beach, South Carolina was first started in 1951 as a way to celebrate the beginning of the tourist season in the seaside community. Parades and family oriented events helped draw crowds down to the beach and the Myrtle Beach Pavilion. Early events included Human Checker Board games and a local "law" requiring everyone to wear shorts or a bathing suit or face a fine. Funds went to help build the area's first hospital, Ocean View Memorial Hospital. Beauty contests soon joined the fun of the festival and in 1952 the first Miss SC pageant was held at the Pavilion. Author Mickey Spillane was one of the judges. Long sponsored by Hawaiian Tropic Sun Tan Lotions, the festival now includes Miss Sun Fun and Miss Bikini Wahine. The Sun Fun Festival is the longest running event in Myrtle Beach area history. It is consistently named one of the Southeast Tourism Society’s Top 20 Events. However, the Myrtle Beach Chamber of Commerce cancelled the festival for 2012 and 2013, citing that "it does not bring visitors to the beach as it did in early years and it doesn't pay for itself".

On February 25, 2016, The Oceanfront Merchants Association announced the festival will once again be held. Buz Plyler, owner of Gay Dolphin Gift Cove, will be presenting sponsor.
