= 2015 Cary, North Carolina, mayoral election =

- October 6, 2015
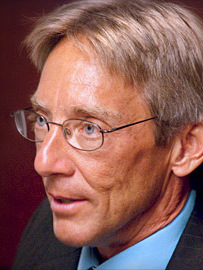

Candidate	Harold Weinbrecht	Write-ins
Party	Nonpartisan	Others
Popular vote	5,126	249
Percentage	95.37%	4.63%
Mayor before election
Harold Weinbrecht
Nonpartisan
Elected mayor
Harold Weinbrecht
Nonpartisan

Cary, North Carolina, held an election for mayor on Tuesday, October 6, 2015. Harold Weinbrecht, the incumbent mayor, ran unopposed and won re-election to a third term. There was an option vote (commonly called "write-in").

== Candidates ==
The only candidate on the ballot was mayor Harold Weinbrecht.

== Results ==
2015 Cary mayoral election
Party	Candidate	Votes	%	±%
Nonpartisan	Harold Weinbrecht (incumbent)	5,126	95.37	+40
Other	Write-ins	249	4.63	N/A
Turnout		5,375		

== See also ==
- List of mayors of Cary, North Carolina
