= Downstown =

American comic strip

- Author: Tim Downs
- Illustrator: Tim Downs
- Current status/schedule: Concluded
- Launch date: 1974
- End date: February 1, 1986
- Syndicate(s): Universal Press Syndicate (1980–1986)
- Genre: Humor

Downstown was an American syndicated comic strip created by Tim Downs that ran from 1974 to 1986.

== History ==
=== Origins ===
During his junior year at Indiana University at Bloomington, Downs created the comic strip Downstown for the campus newspaper, Indiana Daily Student, which immediately began to publish the strip as a daily feature.

Downs said, "I went to college to be a sculptor and a painter. In my freshman year, I became a Christian and soon my attitude began to change toward a career in the fine arts. The problem was that sculpting and painting were intensely personal, almost like therapy, and I had things I wanted to communicate. That led me to graphic design, then comic strips…."

Downstown was syndicated to other college newspapers across the United States. The second college to publish the strip was the New York Institute of Technology in Old Westbury, New York. Between 1974 and 1979, the strip expanded to 30 college newspapers and one non-student paper, Vidette-Messenger of Porter County, of Indiana. The editor of the Daily Illini at the University of Illinois, one of the first to purchase the strip, said, "I think Downstown is the most consistently funny and insightful strip I had ever read. Ever."

=== Syndication ===
In the fall of 1979, Universal Press Syndicate agreed to begin syndication of Downstown. While Universal and Downs made plans for national syndication, the 30 newspapers that carried the strip in its college version had a gap in service as Downstown was no longer available.

Universal felt that a college setting was too narrow for a commercial strip, so Downs changed Downstown to be a strip about singles. The first syndicated Downstown strip was released on March 24, 1980, in 46 newspapers. Downstown appeared as a daily and Saturday/Sunday feature for the next six years. Universal promoted it as "a comic strip that captures the humor and lifestyle of a new generation." This snapshot of current singles life "appealed strongly to baby boomers who recognized themselves and their friends," One reviewer said it "bore a resemblance to early Doonesbury, before Garry Trudeau turned political."

Through syndication, Downstown appeared in more than a hundred major newspapers worldwide, including Chicago Sun-Times, The Detroit News, Edmonton Journal, Miami News, Los Angeles Times, New York Post, St. Louis Post-Dispatch, Tokyo Student Times, and Washington Star. Along with Bloom County and The Far Side, the Los Angeles Times called it "one of the few new comic strips offering original and relevant humor for the '80s…."

After 11 years and about 3,000 comic strips, Downs discontinued Downstown on February 1, 1986. Downs said, "It's gotten harder and harder for me to do Downstown. I finally had to ask myself if it was the kind of strip I wanted to be drawing 10 years from now, and realized that it wasn't.” Downs was living a married life with a son in San Bernardino, California, making it challenging to continue writing about characters based on his college roommate. He noted, "In some ways, the strip is the victim of my growth. To bring it in line, I would have to make radical changes—like marrying Chuck and giving him kids. I'd rather fold it up and start something new."

However, Jim Creighton, features director of the St. Louis Post-Dispatch, noted, "Tim Downs decided to give it up because the strip was not being purchased by enough newspapers to make it worth continuing." If fact, the Los Angeles Times dropped Downstown in 1985, only to bring it back when "extremely loyal" readers sent a "flurry of angry letters." When it ended, Downstown was only in 15 newspapers, representing about two million readers.

Downs ended Downstown with a week-long farewell party attended by characters from other comics, including Charlie Brown, Duke from Doonesbury, Cathy, Little Orphan Annie, Garfield, and Spider-Man. In what appeared to be a collaborative effort, Garry Trudeau killed off Duke the same day. The last day, the character Josh used a pickaxe to break through the panel border, letting the characters fall through, with the final panel being empty white space. Downs says, "I feel that the Downstown characters will always be floating in the margins of the newspaper somewhere."

== Characters and plot ==
Downstown originally featured the antics of a group of three friends—Josh, John, and Fred—in a college in a place named Downstown. In a single-cell promotional comic by Downs that ran in The Daily Illini on October 4, 1975, he describes Downstown as, "the ins and outs, the ups and downs, the joy and tears, the love and hate, the war and peace, the fear and loathing, the dribs and drabs of campus life. by Tim Downs, a student at Indiana University."

The main characters were:

- Josh was the optimist and "Renaissance man manique" who lived in an off-campus apartment with his roommate John.
- John spent his days sleeping or watching television, as his desperate search for a date was always unsuccessful.
- Fred was a sarcastic student who directed campus registration. His favorite food came in bulk—a 50-pound bag of Purina Bachelor Chow.
- Chuck Laylo was an exceptionally smooth and cool fraternity man; a member of the imaginary Sigma Theta fraternity.

Downs says, "John and Jeff were based on my roommate; Chuck Laylo was the composite fraternity guy."

When Downstown became syndicated, Josh and John became Odd Couple-type roommates. Downs shifted his strip's content from college life to contemporary singles life. The strip was "mostly about frustration and women; women and frustration; the ennui of late adolescence." Main characters included:

- Josh who meandered through life, looking for recognition and romance with little success with either. He was "looking for someone who can cook a peanut butter sandwich."
- John was the slob, with mounds of dirty clothes and a refrigerator containing his definition of the four food groups: "fast, frozen, junk, and spoiled." His goal is to find the "perfect sleeping position."
- Fred became a sarcastic waiter at La Poubelle (The Trash Can) where customers dreaded his service, while actual waiters secretly admired him.
- Chuck Laylo morphed from a fraternity guy into a vain and shallow lounge lizard. One writer said, "Laylo embodied the worst qualities of the singles stud bar."
- Malcolm Magnesia was a new character who was "an elementary-school nerd—a sort of '80s version of Charlie Brown."

== Controversy ==
From February 18 to 23, 1985, Downs decided to use Downstown to raise support for famine relief in Ethiopia. This desire linked back to Downs job as a traveling lecturer with the Campus Crusade for Christ which he started working for in 1979. Downs said he wanted to show the "insensitivity that sets in among some Americans to the problem of world hunger. …Humor is a good tool to communicate the message you want to get across."

Downs' series of "heavy-handed satire" depicting a starving Ethiopian child, "or possibly a hunger-shrunken adult," alongside overfed and insensitive Americans were considered "offensive" and "crude" by many readers who were used to a strip that "normally deals breezily with today's singles scene." The first segment, released on a Monday, featured an American in a cowboy hat looking at the Ethiopian boy, and saying, "Wull now, lookie h'yar! A genuuaan Ethiopian boy." The man has fried chicken leg which the boy desires. Rather than sharing, the American throws it away, complaining "Hey!! Ah got a right to chicken dun right!!"

One editor noted, "The Downstown strip had taken a strange turn this week." Newspaper columnist Sue Ann Wood said, "It struck me as questionable taste indeed. The tragedy of starving children in Ethiopia hardly seemed a subject for crude humor in a comic. However, I thought the cartoonist was trying to make a point that some Americans are insensitive to the plight of Ethiopians. I didn't think he was very successful. I hoped he wouldn't try to do it again."

Yet, Downs continued to cover this topic for five more days, leading The Detroit News to cancel Downstown for a time. Downs said, "Well it is a tragic situation and I'm not trying to make light of it. I apologize to anyone I've offended. I was trying to point out the callous attitude people tend to have about hunger in the world."

Downs concluded the sequence with a coupon to donate to two world hunger charities, World Vision International and Food for the Hungry. Downs did not contact the charities in advance. In the first week, Food for the Hungry attributed thirty donations totaling $555 to Downstown. World Vision expected several hundred donations as a result of Downstown, noting that a similar strip's appeal in December 1984 raised $97,000 for the non-denominational Christian charity. Brian Bird, spokesman for World Hunger, said, "He [Downs] may have offended some people. But I don't feel sorry for them. We all need to learn a lesson about the importance of giving—and continuing to give even when the immediate crisis is over and people don't look like they're starving to death."

When asked if he thought a comic was the right place for such a serious topic, Downs answered, "Sometimes. Not all comics are like they used to be—a simple gag line. I do gag lines too, but I think a comic strip can be a vehicle to put across serious thought. I believe that I can use humor as a tool to make a point."

== Christianity ==
With regards to Downstown, Downs says, "I wrote a Christian comic because I am a Christian. …My basic philosophy is a biblical philosophy of life." However, he opted to be subtle so he would not alienate readers. There were exceptions, however. For example, in one strip, a child writes Santa Claus and asks, "They say you know if we've been sleeping; you know if we're awake. Doesn't this demand omnipresence? You know if we've been bad or good. This implies your authority to assign moral absolutes. Are you aware of the staggering theological implications of these claims?”

Downs also converted Evangelical philosopher Francis Schaeffer into the character Captain Relative. Captain Relative does goods deeds such as rescuing a girl's cat from a tree, but throws it in the bushes when he learns the girl has no money for a reward. Downs also expressed his beliefs when broke with the usual tone of Downstown to call attention to the famine in Ethiopia and to encourage his readers to contribute to two faith-based charities.

== Design and creation ==
Downstown was a horizontal four-panel strip that was primarily black and white but also ran in color for weekends.

Downs's cartooning style has been described as "crisp and uncluttered." He followed a strict schedule for writing and drawing, creating one strip a day." He says he "wrote in bunches, always carrying a notebook" in case inspiration struck.

== Collected editions ==
The Indiana Daily Student published three Downstown collections—Downstown: This is Winning? (1977), Downstown: With Love, Chuck (1978). and Downstown: Get in There and Quit (1978). Downs self-published a collection The Laylo Papers: The Complete Guide to Relationships.
