= 2011 Cary, North Carolina, mayoral election =

- October 11, 2011
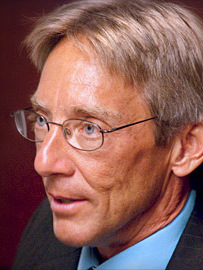

Candidate	Harold Weinbrecht	Michelle Muir
Party	Nonpartisan	Nonpartisan
Popular vote	10,604	7,507
Percentage	58.49%	41.41%
Mayor before election
Harold Weinbrecht
Nonpartisan
Elected mayor
Harold Weinbrecht
Nonpartisan

Cary, North Carolina, held an election for mayor on Tuesday, October 11, 2011. Harold Weinbrecht, the incumbent mayor, faced off against Michelle Muir, a businesswoman and former member of the Cary Chamber of Commerce. Weinbrecht defeated Muir, winning re-election to a second term in office.

== Candidates ==
- Harold Weinbrecht, Mayor of Cary since 2007
- Michelle Muir, businesswoman

== Endorsements ==
Harold Weinbrecht

Newspapers

- Indy Week

== Results ==
2011 Cary mayoral election
Party	Candidate	Votes	%	±%
Nonpartisan candidate	Harold Weinbrecht (incumbent)	10,604	58.49	
Nonpartisan candidate	Michelle Muir	7,507	41.41	
Other	Write-ins	19	0.10	N/A
Turnout		18,130		

== See also ==
- List of mayors of Cary, North Carolina
