= Harold Weinbrecht =

American politician (born 1956)

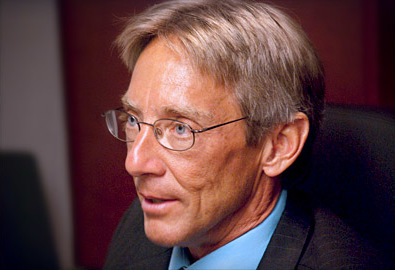

Mayor of Cary, North Carolina
- Incumbent
- Assumed office December 2007
- Preceded by: Ernie McAlister

Cary Town Council
- In office 1999–2007

Personal details
- Born: 1956 (age 69–70) Augusta, Georgia, U.S.
- Party: Democratic
- Spouse: Belinda Weinbrecht
- Children: Audrey Weinbrecht; Cara Weinbrecht
- Education: Augusta College; North Carolina State University
- Profession: Software programmer
- Website: mayorweinbrecht.com

Harold Weinbrecht (born 1956) is an American computer programmer and politician who has been the mayor of Cary, North Carolina since 2007.

== Early life ==
Weinbrecht was born in Augusta, Georgia. His family lived in Cary from 1957 to 1967. His uncle was Fred Bond, Jr, the former mayor of Cary. He attended Augusta College and North Carolina State University, receiving a B.S. in both computer science and mathematics.

== Politics ==
In 1997, amid disputes between developers and citizens, Weinbrecht launched the website Citizens for Balanced Growth where he wrote about local issues and town council meetings.

He became the chair of Cary's new Information Services Advisory Board in 1998. In 1999, he was named to Cary’s Planning and Zoning Board. That same year, Weinbrecht was elected to an at-large town council seat.

Though his opponent spent six times more on advertising, Weinbrecht won the 2007 Cary, North Carolina, mayoral election, winning approval on 58% of ballots cast over incumbent Ernie McAlister. One of the key issues in the election was growth, with Weinbrecht proposing a balanced approach. During his first term as mayor, Weinbrecht formed the Citizen Issue Review Commission and created a town sustainability manager position. Weinbrecht was re-elected as mayor in 2011, 2015, 2019, and 2023. His current term expires in December 2027.

== Professional affiliations ==
Weinbrecht is a past president of the Wake County Mayors Association. He has also served on the Wake County’s Growth Management Task Force and is chairman of the Capital Area Metropolitan Planning Organization.

== Career ==
In 1994, he became a programmer for SAS Institute. He was previously a simulations engineer. He retired in 2022 after 28 years at SAS.

== Personal life ==
In 1987, Weinbrecht married Belinda and returned to Cary. They have two children. He is an active member of Cary Presbyterian Church, where he teaches Sunday school, and maintains a daily exercise routine of two hours.
