= Tim Downs =

American comic artist and writer

- Born: 1954 (age 71–72)
- Education: Indiana University
- Occupations: Novelist, comic artist, religious speaker
- Writing career
- Genres: Crime drama, comic strip
- Subject: Crime Investigation
- Notable works: Bug Man, Downstown
- Notable awards: Christy Award

Tim Downs (born 1954) is an American comic artist and author best known for his Downstown comic strip and the Bug Man series of Christian mystery novels.

== Background ==
Downs grew up in a non-religious household near Town and Country, St. Louis County, Missouri, with his parents Charles and Bobbie Downs. While in 7th grade at Parkway Junior High School. Downs came in first place for an oratory contest sponsored by the Des Peres Optimist Club, later coming in third place in the regional contest sponsored by the Optimist Clubs of St. Louis.

In high school, Downs began to doodle single-panel comics, influenced by Charles Schultz's Peanuts, often drawing on paper towels at the can factory where he worked as an evening janitor. Downs was unsuccessful selling his work.

Downs graduated from Parkway West High School in 1972. He attended the Indiana University at Bloomington, becoming a Phi Beta Kappa and graduating in 1976 with B.A. in fine arts, with an emphasis in graphic design. During his junior year at Indiana, Downs created a comic strip, Downstown, for the campus newspaper, Indiana Daily Student. Downs said, "I went to college to be a sculptor and a painter. In my freshman year, I became a Christian and soon my attitude began to change toward a career in the fine arts. The problem was that sculpting and painting were intensely personal, almost like therapy, and I had things I wanted to communicate. That led me to graphic design, then comic strips…."

Downstown featured a group of friends in a college setting. The main characters were the optimist Josh who lived in an off-campus apartment, his roommate John who spent his days sleeping or watching television, their friend Fred who was a sarcastic waiter, and Chuck Laylo who was a smooth lady's man and member of the imaginary Sigma Theta fraternity. The comic strip expanded to 30 college newspapers from 1974 through 1979, continuing after Downs' graduation. The editor of the Daily Illini at the University of Illinois said, "I think Downstown is the most consistently funny and insightful strip I had ever read. Ever."

The Indiana Daily Student published three Downstown collections—Downstown: This is Winning? (1977), Downstown: With Love, Chuck (1978). and Downstown: Get in There and Quit (1978).

== Publications ==
=== Downstown ===
On March 24, 1980, Downstown began syndication through Universal Press Syndicate. To appeal to a broader audience, Downs shifted his comic's content from college life to the singles life, and added new characters such as the nerd Malcolm Magnesia and changed Chuck Laylo into a shallow lounge lizard. Universal promoted it as "a comic strip that captures the humor and lifestyle of new generation." The Los Angeles Times called it "one of the few new comic strips offering original and relevant humor for the '80s…" along with Bloom County and The Far Side. Through syndication, Downstown appeared in more than a hundred major newspapers worldwide, including Chicago Sun-Times, Edmonton Journal, Miami News, Los Angeles Times, and New York Post.

In February 1985, Downs decided to use Downstown to raise money for famine relief in Ethiopia. His series of satirical comic strips depicting a starving Ethiopian child alongside overfed and insensitive Americans were considered offensive by many readers. Newspaper columnist Sue Ann Wood said, "It struck me as questionable taste indeed. The tragedy of starving children in Ethiopia hardly seemed a subject for crude humor in a comic. However, I thought the cartoonist was trying to make a point that some Americans are insensitive to the plight of Ethiopians. I didn't think he was very successful. I hoped he wouldn't try to do it again." Yet, Downs continued to cover this topic for six days, leading The Detroit News to cancel Downstown. Downs concluded the sequence with information on how to donate to world hunger charities, and did raise money for those charities.

After 11 years and about 3,000 comic strips, Downs discontinued Downstown on February 1, 1986. Downs said, "It's gotten harder and harder for me to do Downstown. I finally had to ask myself if it was the kind of strip I wanted to be drawing 10 years from now, and realized that it wasn't." In short, Downs was living the married life with a son in San Bernardino, California, making it challenging to continue writing about characters based on his college roommate. However, one newspaper editor noted, "Tim Downs decided to give it up because the strip was not being purchased by enough newspapers to make it worth continuing."

Downs ended Downstown with a week-long farewell party visited by characters from other comics, including Charlie Brown, Duke from Doonesbury, Cathy, Little Orphan Annie, Garfield, and Spider-Man. The last day, his character Josh uses an axe to break through the panel border, letting the characters fall through, with the final panel being empty white space. Downs says, "I feel that the Downstown characters will always be floating in the margins of the newspaper somewhere."

Downs self-published a retrospective collection of the series, The Laylo Papers: The Complete Guide to Relationships (1989).

=== Bug Man series ===
In 2003, Downs published Like Flies to a Corpse (later renamed Shoofly Pie), the first book in his Christian murder mystery series, Bug Man. The six-volume series features forensic entomologist Dr. Nick Polchak who uses the insects he finds on murder victims to solve crimes. The series includes: Shoofly Pie (2003), Chop Shop (2004), First the Dead (2008), Less than Dead (2009), Ends of the Earth (2009), and Nick of Time (2011). To ensure scientific accuracy, Downs attended a forensic entomology seminar for crime scene investigators and coroners.

The first two Bug Man books were published by Howard Publishing, an imprint of Simon & Schuster, with Downs changing to Thomas Nelson with the third book. Downs said, " I made the switch simply because Nelson is so much larger and can bring greater resources to the marketing of my books."

In a review for Chop Shop, Publishers Weekly wrote, "Downs keeps the pages turning with some excellent twists and first-rate humor. He laudably knows how to show rather than tell—a rarity for Christian fiction. ...Downs's flair for the unusual—makes him a writer to watch in the faith fiction market."

Shoofly Pie received a Silver Angel Award, for works with moral or ethical impact, from Excellence in Media. Chop Shop received the Book of the Year Silver Award from ForeWord magazine in 2005. First the Dead was given a starred review from Publishers Weekly for its "taut writing and well-developed characters."

=== Other novels ===
Downs also wrote three stand-alone novels, all published by Thomas Nelson: Plague Maker (2006), Head Game (2007), and Wonders Never Cease (2010). Plague Maker received a Christy Award for best suspense book in 2007. Although Plague Maker is not part of the Bug Man series, it does include a cameo by Dr. Nick Polchak. One reviewer noted, "Downs knows his bugs and his techno stuff, but what makes this work so well is the appeal of the characters...." Publishers Weekly said, "This is Downs's best book to date."

Downs also collaborated with Ted Dekker and Davis Bunn for The Christian Fiction Collection for Men (2003), also published by Thomas Nelson.

=== Nonfiction ===
With Vinh Chung, Downs wrote Where the Wind Leads: A Refugee Family's Miraculous Story of Loss, Rescue, and Redemption (2014), published by Thomas Nelson. This book covers Chung's experience in communist-ruled Vietnam, his family's daring escape as boat people, and assimilation as a refugee in Arkansas, U.S. Although aimed at the Christian market, reviewers indicated that this book could have a broader reach.

Downs has written nonfiction books on Christian relationships and communication, all published by Moody Press. Finding Common Ground: How to Communicate with those Outside the Christian Community (1999) received the Gold Medallion Award from the Evangelical Christian Publishing Association in 2000. Co-written with his wife Joy, Down's other nonfiction titles include Fight Fair: Winning at Conflict without Losing at Love (2003), The Seven Conflicts: Resolving the Most Common Disagreements in Marriage (2003), and One of Us Must Be Crazy...and I'm Pretty Sure It's You: Making Sense of the Difference that Divide Us (2010).

== Personal ==
Downs lives in Cary, North Carolina, with his wife, and has three adult children. He is the founder of the Communication Center, a training and consulting ministry of Campus Crusade for Christ which he has worked for since 1979. In addition to lecturing on college campuses, he and his wife present A Weekend to Remember, a marriage and parenting conference held across the United States.
