= Koka Booth =

American politician (1932–2023)

Mayor of Cary, North Carolina
- In office 1987–1999
- Preceded by: Harold D. Ritter
- Succeeded by: Glen Lang

Personal details
- Born: Koka Edward Booth Jr. August 12, 1932 Kenova, West Virginia, US
- Died: October 23, 2023 (aged 91) Cary, North Carolina, US

Koka Edward Booth Jr. (August 12, 1932 – October 23, 2023) was a former mayor of Cary, North Carolina. He served as mayor between 1987 and 1999. He is the namesake of Koka Booth Amphitheatre in Cary.

== Early life ==
Booth was born on August 12, 1932, in Kenova, West Virginia. He was one of seven children born to Koka Edward Booth Sr. and Susan Ann Booth. After he graduated from Ceredo-Kenova High School in 1950, his family moved to Rocky Mount, North Carolina. There, he worked with his brother at the Carolina Machinery & Supply Company as a service engineer. He graduated from the Dodge School of Transmissioneering in May 1953.

== Career ==
Booth was a coal miner in Kenova. Eventually, he owned a share of a coal mine, which he sold at a profit.

He worked at Aeroglide Corporation in the Research Triangle Park in North Carolina from 1971 until 1993. He worked in the communications department at SAS Institute in Cary, North Carolina from 1993 until 2007.

Booth was appointed to fill a vacancy in the Cary town council in 1978. He was then elected to the town council, serving on it for 22 years. He was Cary's 34th mayor, serving for twelve years between 1987 and 1999. While Booth was mayor, Cary experienced economic growth fueled by technology companies like IBM and SAS. He facilitated paving roads and constructing a water treatment plant. He helped bring a YMCA and a conferenced center to Cary and established Fred G. Bond Metro Park. Near the end of his tenure, Booth commissioned architects to design what became the Amphitheatre at Regency Park; it opened in 2000. In 2004, the amphitheatre was renamed the Koka Booth Amphitheatre in his honor.

== Personal life ==
Booth met his wife, Blanche Estelle Wilkens, while living in Rocky Mount, North Carolina. They married on November 27, 1954. The couple had two sons. They moved to Raleigh, North Carolina in 1955 and, then, to Kenova, West Virginia. While working for a coal mine, Booth injured his face and required plastic surgery. The family returned to Raleigh and moved to Cary in 1971. Booth felt that his sons would have no future in West Virginia and was attracted by the reputation of Cary High School's band.

Booth had a stroke in 2004, which required eighteen months of physical therapy and later brought on dementia. Booth died on October 10, 2023, in Cary. Flags around Cary were flown at half-mast for twelve days, symbolizing the twelve years that he was mayor.
