= Jan Johansson (bluegrass musician) =

Swedish-born American musician (born 1958)

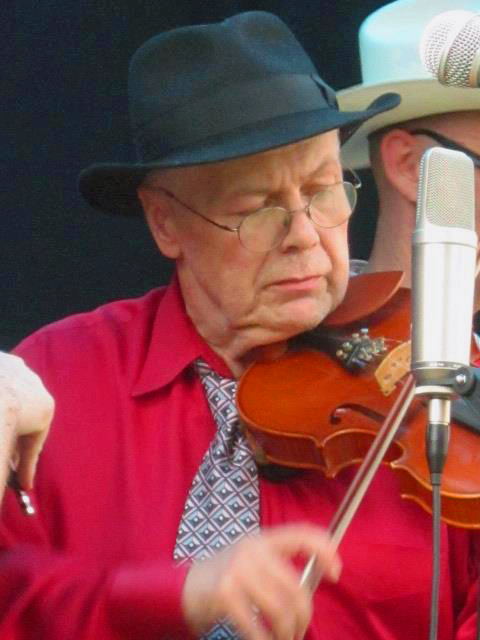
Jan Johansson in 2012

Jan Peder Johansson (born 1958 in Ursviken, Skellefteå kommun, Västerbottens län, Sweden) is a musician, composer, producer and teacher who lives in Cary, North Carolina, and has been active in the United States since 1986.

He is the founder of Johansson's Acoustic Music Studio (JAMS) which teaches acoustic music. He has done doctoral candidate studies at Stockholm's University and University of California at Los Angeles.

== Discography ==
- 1993 – Timeless (New Vintage Bluegrass Band)
- 1995 – No Time for The Blues (New Vintage Bluegrass Band)
- 1996 – Sands of Time (New Vintage Bluegrass Band)
- [..] – Requests from The Crowds (Roby Huffman)
- [..] – Pickin on Michael W Smith (Various Artists)
- [..] – Jeff Huffman (Jeff Huffman)
- [..] – Samantha Casey (Samantha Casey)
- [..] – Goodnight Gracies (Jan Johansson & Friends)
- [..] – Barbara Keller (Jan Johansson & Friends)
- 1999 – Swedish Medley (Jan Johansson & Friends)
- 1999 – Rambling (Jan Johansson & Friends)
- 2003 – Mandolin Rose (Lorraine Jordan)
- 2004 – Acoustic Sampler (Jan Johansson & Friends)
- 2006 – Kindred (Jan Johansson & Friends)
- 2009 – Smiling Faces (Jan Johansson & Friends)
- 2012 – Nordic Impressions (Jan Johansson)
- 2013 – Juxtaposed (Jan Johansson)
- 2014 – Road to Happy Destiny (Jan Johansson)
