= Glen Lang =

American hockey player and politician

- Born: January 4, 1968 (age 58) Minneapolis, Minnesota, U.S.
- Height: 6 ft 2 in (188 cm)
- Weight: 194 lb (88 kg; 13 st 12 lb)
- Position: Right Wing
- Shot: Right
- Played for: Raleigh IceCaps; Johnstown Chiefs; Columbus Chill; Tulsa Oilers
- Playing career: 1993–1996

Glen Lang

Mayor of Cary, North Carolina
- Preceded by: Koka Booth
- Succeeded by: Ernie McAlister
- In office 1999–2003

Cary Town Council
- In office 1997–1999

Personal details
- Party: Democratic
- Education: University of Wisconsin–Superior; University of Minnesota Duluth
- Occupation: CEO Capitol Broadband and Connexion Technologies
- Awards: University of Wisconsin–Superior Athletic Hall of Fame

Glen Lang (born January 4, 1968) is an American businessman and politician who served as mayor of Cary, North Carolina from 1999 to 2003. He also was a professional hockey player.

== Early life ==
Lang was born in Minneapolis, Minnesota. He attended St. Paul High School where he played hockey and graduated in 1988.

Lang then attended the University of Minnesota Duluth from 1988 to 1989 where he played hockey. He transferred to the University of Wisconsin–Superior receiving a B.S. in business communication in 1993. While at the University of Wisconsin–Superior, he played hockey all three years and was named First Team All-American two times. He "is considered to be among the best offensive players in team history and in NCAA Division III hockey history."

== Hockey ==
After graduation, he was a professional hockey player in the position of right wing and forward. From 1993 to 1994, he played for the Johnstown Chiefs and the Raleigh IceCaps. From 1994 and 1995, he played with the Columbus Chill. He played with the Tulsa Oilers from 1994 to 1996.

== Career ==
Early in his career, Lang worked in technology marketing for Sun Microsystems, Control Data Corporation, and Intergraph.

Glen co-founded Accura Innovative Services in 1991 and served as its CEO. After rapid growth, the company was sold.

Lang is the chief executive officer of Capitol Broadband, a wireless communications company. In 2002, he founded and became the CEO of the Cary-based Capital Broadband's subsidiary Connexion Technologies which specialized in FTTH networks, providing Internet and television services to multi-family housing complexes. Investors in the Connextion Technologies include James Goodnight, founder of SAS Institute. In 2010, Connextion Technologies was selected by Inc. magazine as one of the nation’s fastest-growing companies, with a 263% growth rate over three years.

In 2012, Connexion Technologies declared bankruptcy with a debt of some $500 million. From its workforce of 600, it laid off eighty people in January 2012, and cut 140 jobs at its headquarters in April 2012. The company's downfall was the loss of a contract with DirecTV.

== Politics ==
Lang is a liberal Democrat. He first entered politics in 1997 with a self-financed bid for the Cary Town Council in Cary, North Carolina. He won, and, two years later, sought and was elected mayor in 1999.

During his time in Cary politics, Lang was an outspoken advocate of slower growth for the rapidly expanding town as well as for infrastructure improvements, incurring the ire of local developers by supporting increased fees for residential development. As mayor, he enacted the Adequate Public Facilities ordinance and other controls on growth. As a result, Cary's growth slow significantly—the growth rate changed from 13% to under 3% under Lang's leadership. However, councilwoman Maria Dorrel though his style was abrasive and created a "hostile atmosphere."

Lang filed for re-election but did not campaign. In the 2003 race Lang placed third, and said the reason for his loss was because he only spent $10 to file and nothing on his campaign. He was succeeded as mayor by Ernie McAlister.

In 2017, Lang started a bi-partisan political action group called New Southern Voices. The groups' focus is working on policy that the majority of people can agree with, such as gerrymandering and voting rights.

== Honors ==
- University of Wisconsin–Superior Athletic Hall of Fame, 2006

== Personal life ==
Lang is a millionaire.
