= Fred Bond =

American politician (1929–1997)

Mayor of Cary, North Carolina
- In office 1971–1983
- Preceded by: Joseph R. Veasey
- Succeeded by: Harold D. Ritter

Cary Town Council
- In office 1965–1983

Personal details
- Born: Fred Gaines Bond Jr. January 1, 1929 Elbert County, Georgia, US
- Died: June 1, 1997 (aged 68) Wake County, North Carolina, US
- Education: University of Georgia; Abraham Baldwin Agricultural College
- Occupation: General Manager, Flue Cured Tobacco Stabilization Corporation
- Profession: tobacco industry representative

Fred Gaines Bond Jr. (January 1, 1929 – June 1, 1997) was an American politician and tobacco industry representative, associated with the Flue Cured Tobacco Stabilization Corporation (now the U.S. Tobacco Cooperative). He was a three-term mayor of Cary, North Carolina.

When he died, Bond was hailed as a “founding father" of Cary. Koka Booth, a later mayor of Cary, said, "Whatever Cary was and whatever Cary will be was because of Fred Bond's leadership."

== Early life ==
Bond was born in Elbert County, Georgia and was raised on a 102–acre cotton farm that also grew wheat, cantaloupe, watermelon, sweet potatoes, and food crops for the family's consumption. He graduated from Bowman High School in 1945, and then attended Abraham Baldwin Agricultural College where his uncle was a professor. At that time the institution was a junior college; Bond graduated in 1947.

Next, he attended the University of Georgia where he studied agricultural economics. During the summers, he worked at a state agricultural experimental station in Tifton, Georgia that was studying the impact of insecticides on tobacco. In the spring of 1949, Bond was three–credit hours shy of graduating. With the university's consent, he took a job as an assistant county extension agent in Worth County, Georgia, while he completed his coursework by correspondence.

== Career ==
Once Bond completed his college degree in May 1949, he advanced to the position of agricultural extension officer in Atkinson County, Georgia where they farmed hogs, tobacco, and pine trees for turpentine. He work ranged from vaccinating hogs to working with the 4-H to teaching farmers about innovations in tobacco. In early 1952, Bond organized a program for farmers about the benefits of tobacco price stabilization programs. Bond's presentation impressed the general manager of the Flue-Cured Tobacco Cooperative Stabilization Corporation who invited Bond to Raleigh, North Carolina for an interview. Bond accepted a position as assistant to the general manager in May 1952.

From 1952 to 1995, Bond worked with the Flue-Cured Tobacco Cooperative Stabilization Corporation which operated from offices on Fayetteville Street in Raleigh, North Carolina. This cooperative commodity marketing organization, now known as the U.S. Tobacco Cooperative, oversees the federal price support program, allowing the tobacco to be purchased with borrowed federal money if the market is bad, properly storing the tobacco until market prices are more favorable. The corporation represents the states where flue–cured tobacco is grown—Florida, Georgia, North Carolina, South Carolina, and Virginia. As the assistant to the general manager, Bond traveled across the five-state service area, visiting tobacco farmers and making presentations about the benefits of quotas and price support. In 1968, Bond became general manager and secretary/treasurer of the corporation. He served in this role of chief executive officer for 23 years, retiring on December 31, 1995.

After retiring, Bond created Bond Associates, Inc., a government lobbyist firm on behalf of tobacco growers.

== Politics ==
In 1964, Bond served on the Cary Zoning Board of Adjustments. In 1965, he was elected to the Cary Town Council, and re-elected in 1969 and 1971. The council unanimously chose Bond mayor in 1971. Council elected Bond for a second term of mayor in 1973. In 1975, Cary residents voted to elect their town's mayor directly and for an expanded four-year term. Bond ran for mayor in 1975—unopposed. In 1979, he was elected to another term as mayor, again running unopposed. After twelve years as mayor and eighteen years on the town's council, Bond announced he would not seek reelection in 1983. He said, "There comes a time when you must break away, and after 18 years, I've reached that point." However, Bond was "a very popular elected official," and would have had no opposition if he had sought re-election.

While Bond was mayor, Cary's population grew from 7,000 to 26,000, becoming North Carolina's fastest-growing town. Bond oversaw the change from a "sleepy little Raleigh bedroom community into its explosive expansion into a small city…'" His strategy was to encourage and manage growth, while still maintaining the town that was a desirable place to live. He wanted to keep what he referred to as "village atmosphere". Bond also gave "Cary a vision of what it might be like 20 or 30 years down the road." As part of this, Cary was the first city in North Carolina to authorize Planned Unit Development or PUDs, a unique solution to Cary's growth issues.

Bond was described as having "a quiet dignity and a steely, get-it-done attitude". Under his leadership, the town organized its operations into governmental departments, expanding planning and recreation. Cary also built a new library and a new town hall. Bond created an Appearance Commission and a downtown improvement program, leading the town to revitalize its downtown area, making sure "that old Cary didn't get left behind in the wake of burgeoning development".

Bond was also concerned that Cary's tax base consisted almost entirely of homeowners. He created a council commission to attract industrial development and businesses in 1981. That same year, Cary's residents approved a bond referendum to end Cary's dependence on Raleigh by creating the town's own sewer and water system. Bond oversaw the transition.

When a Cary resident complained of verbal abuse by a police officer in 1982, Bond fired the officer. He also wrote a personal apology letter to the woman who complained. However, Bond would never discuss the incident. He said, "It served no good purpose to pursue the matter endlessly."

Bond was known for his ability to get "two opposing factions to work together". His only disappointment in his political career was his failure to bring a hospital to Cary; however, a hospital opened in Cary eight years later, in 1991.

== Affiliations ==
Bond served on the board North Carolina State University's N.C Agricultural Foundation and co-chaired a campaign that raised more than $10 million. He also served on North Carolina Credit Union Advisory Board, the Wake County Long-Range Hospital Planning Committee, and the Field Crops Advisory Committee of the Federal Land Bank in Columbia, South Carolina.

== Honors ==
When Bond retired, he was honored for his 43 years of work with the tobacco industry by a roast at the Crabtree Valley Mall Marriott Hotel in Raleigh, North Carolina. This event also launched a scholarship campaign in his honor.

The Fred G. Bond Scholarship Endowment was created when a national steering committee from the tobacco and agricultural industry raised $600,000 in his honor. The committee's fundraising goal was $500,000. The Bond Endowment provides scholarships for undergraduate students at the College of Agriculture and Life Sciences at North Carolina State University.

In 1981, Cary named what would become its largest park in his honor. Opening June 1, 1985, the Fred G. Bond Metro Park has 310 acres and is "an oasis in the middle of town". The park includes athletic fields, an amphitheater, boathouse, a challenge course, a community center, hiking trails, picnic shelters, a playground, and a senior center. At the southern end of the park is Bond Lake and with a boathouse and boat rentals.

The "Fred Bond Bust" is part of Cary's permanent public art collection. It was cast in bronze by artist Carl Regutti in 1998 and was installed in two places: by the Bond Lake Boat House and at the Cary Town Hall Campus at316 N. Academy Street, Cary.

== Personal ==
Bond was married to Colene Fellas Wood. They moved from Georgia to Cary, North Carolina for Bond's work. They had four children who were Cary natives: Lisa, Mark, Sharon, and Tim. Bond was an active member of First United Methodist Church in Cary. He was also president of the Triangle Recreation Club.

Bond survived cancer in 1981, but died in 1997 after his cancer returned.

== External Sources ==
- Fred Bond tobacco Interview (audio recording). Southern Oral History Program, University of North Carolina at Chapel Hill, November 19, 1996.
