= Jane Helwig =

American computer programmer (1947–2021)

Jane T. Helwig
- Born: August 27, 1947; Charlotte, North Carolina
- Died: March 29, 2021 (aged 73); Charlotte, North Carolina
- Known for: Co-founding SAS Institute
- Spouse: Richard A. Helwig
- Children: 6

Jane T. Helwig (August 27, 1947–March 29, 2021) was a computer programmer and cofounder of SAS Institute, which develops and distributes the SAS software suite.

== Biography ==
=== Early life and education ===
Jane T. Helwig was born in Charlotte, North Carolina on August 27, 1947. She has a brother, Stephen Davis Timberlake V. She graduated from Stuart Hall School in Staunton, Virginia. She received a BS in chemistry from the University of North Carolina at Chapel Hill in 1970, and an MD cum laude in 1992.

=== SAS Institute ===
Helwig co-founded SAS Institute with James Goodnight, John Sall and Anthony James Barr in 1976. At this point, Helwig was the technical writer for the group. The company develops the SAS System of software, which is used for data management, analytics and machine learning.

Goodnight and Barr had originally developed SAS as a research project at NCSU, but it quickly evolved into a larger business. They obtained the rights to the software system from NCSU and incorporated SAS Institute as a private company in 1976. SAS moved into a temporary office near campus before moving to the company's permanent headquarters. Helwig is credited with selecting the location of SAS' eventual headquarters in Cary, North Carolina. Helwig and the other founders used side income from consulting to cover the company's expenses during its first year of operation; it would go on to have a global revenue of $3.2 billion in 2021.

During the early days of SAS, the founders worked to create a corporate culture that was less bureaucratic and more flexible. The company implemented subsidized on-site childcare to make it easier for employees to raise children while working at SAS. This policy was partly inspired by Helwig, who was raising young children while acting as vice president.

=== Seasoned Systems ===
In 1981, Helwig left SAS and sold her stake in the company. Barr had done the same in 1979. This left Goodnight and Sall as co-owners of the company. She co-founded the computer company Seasoned Systems with her husband. She was also the spokeswoman for the company.

=== Medical career ===
She and her family later moved to San Francisco so that she could complete her medical residency as an OBGYN at University of California, San Francisco. After completing her residency, she practiced medicine in Virginia and South Carolina.

=== Later life and death ===
After her retirement, she nannied her grandchildren, which she considered to be "her favorite job of all". She died of pancreatic cancer on March 29, 2021.
