= James Goodnight =

American businessman and software developer (born 1943)

Jim Goodnight
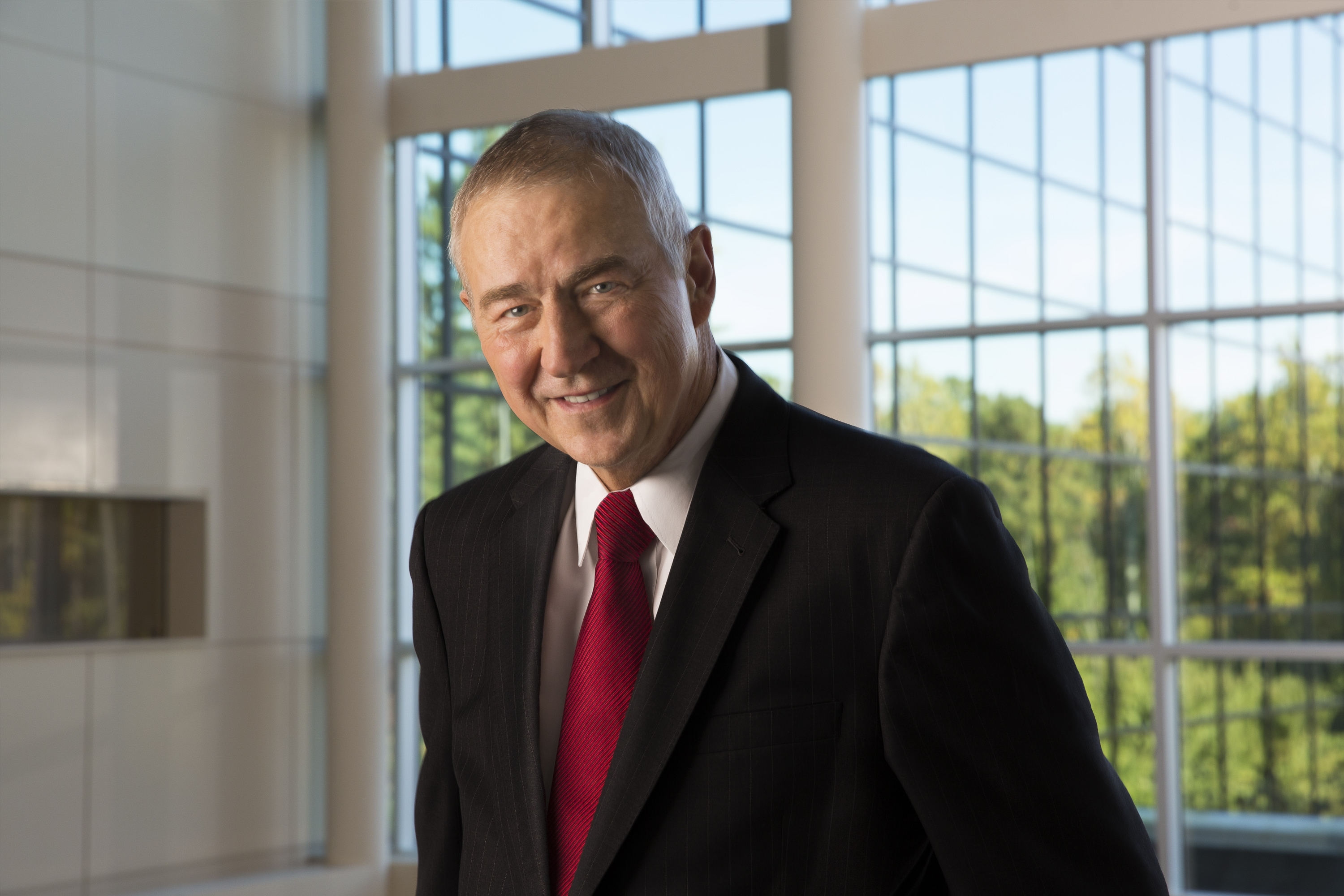
- Born: James Howard Goodnight; January 6, 1943 (age 83); Salisbury, North Carolina, U.S.
- Education: North Carolina State University (BS, MS, PhD)
- Title: Co-founder and CEO, SAS
- Term: 1976–present
- Spouse: Ann Goodnight
- Children: 3

James Howard Goodnight (born January 6, 1943) is an American billionaire businessman and software developer. He has been the CEO of SAS since 1976, which he co-founded that year with other faculty members of North Carolina State University. As of 2025, his net worth was estimated at US$18.5 billion, according to Bloomberg Billionaires Index and he is regarded as the richest person in North Carolina.

== Early life and career ==
Goodnight was born to Albert Goodnight and Dorothy Patterson in Salisbury, North Carolina, on January 6, 1943. He lived in Greensboro until he was 12, when his family moved to Wilmington. As a kid he worked at his father's hardware store.

Goodnight's career with computers began with a Mathematics course at North Carolina State University. One summer he got a job writing software programs for the agricultural economics department. Goodnight was a member of the Beta-Beta chapter of Tau Kappa Epsilon at NC State, and contributed to the construction of a new fraternity house for the chapter in 2002.

Goodnight received a master's degree in statistics in 1968. He also worked at a company building electronic equipment for the ground stations that communicated with the Apollo space capsules. While working on the Apollo program, Goodnight experienced a work environment with a high turnover rate and this shaped his views on corporate culture. Goodnight returned to North Carolina State University after working on the Apollo project, where he earned a PhD in statistics and was a faculty member from 1972 to 1976.

== Career ==
=== Creation of SAS at NCSU ===
While at North Carolina State, Goodnight collaborated with fellow faculty member Anthony James Barr as project leaders for a research project to create a general purpose statistical analysis system (the original meaning of the name SAS) for analyzing agricultural data. The project was operated by a consortium of eight land-grant universities and funded primarily by the USDA. John Sall joined the project in 1973.

=== Founding SAS Institute ===
In 1976, the software had 100 customers, and Goodnight made the decision to establish a private company around it. Goodnight, together with Sall, Barr, and Jane Helwig, left NCSU to found SAS Institute. They were originally based out of an office across the street from the university.

By 1979, SAS had outgrown its original office in Raleigh. Goodnight felt that it would be good for the company to move out of the city and into a more "serene" location, and the group eventually decided on Cary, North Carolina. SAS Institute moved into a new office there in 1980.

=== Growth and expansion ===
As of 2025, Goodnight has remained CEO of SAS Institute for nearly 50 years. Under his leadership, the company experienced continuous growth. Its revenue increased from $138,000 in its first year in business, to $420 million in 1993 and $3.2 billion in 2022.

SAS develops several suites of software related to statistical analysis, machine learning, deep learning, computer vision and natural language processing, including SAS, JMP and SAS Viya.

The SAS campus in Cary has grown to cover 900 acres, with approximately 4,000 out of the company's 10,000 employees based there.

For most of SAS' history, Goodnight rejected acquisition offers and chose not to take SAS public to protect the company's work environment. Goodnight had been guiding the company's preparation for an initial public offering (IPO) since 2021, with plans to go public by 2024. However, as of April 2026, SAS walked back its plans to go public.

=== Leadership style ===
Goodnight created SAS' corporate culture, often described by the media as "utopian." Throughout the company's history, Goodnight has maintained a flat and flexible organizational structure at the company. During the company's early years, he introduced benefits such as profit sharing, 35-hour work weeks, on-site medical care, childcare, and other services for employees which have contributed to improved productivity and employee retention.

HSM Global described Goodnight's leadership style in a framework of three pillars: "help employees do their best work by keeping them intellectually challenged and by removing distractions; make managers responsible for sparking creativity; eliminate arbitrary distinctions between 'suits' and 'creatives'; engage customers as creative partners to help deliver superior products."

== Awards and recognition ==
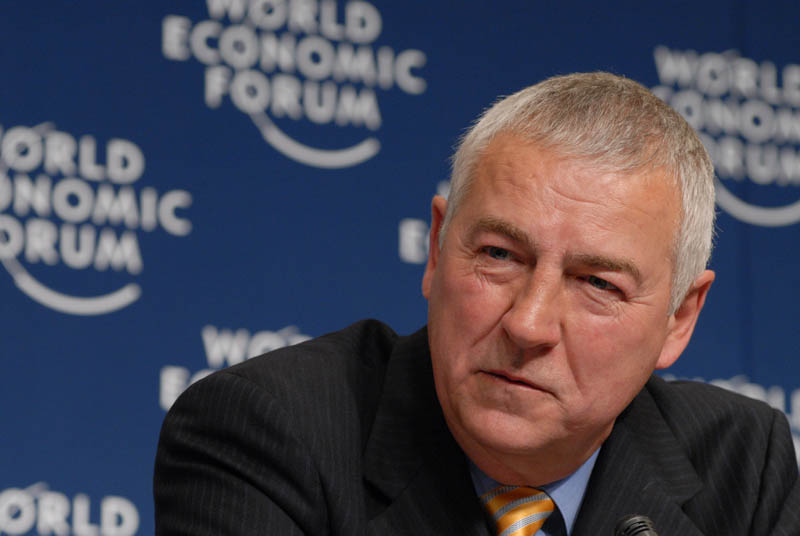
Goodnight at the World Economic Forum in Cologny, Geneva

In 1981, Goodnight was elected as a Fellow of the American Statistical Association. Goodnight has been called the "Godfather of AI" for his role in the creation of SAS.

In 1997, he received the Golden Plate Award of the American Academy of Achievement. In 2004, he was named a Great American Business Leader by Harvard Business School. That same year he was named one of America's 25 Most Fascinating Entrepreneurs by Inc. Magazine. He has also been a frequent speaker and participant at the World Economic Forum. In March 2020, Jim Goodnight was awarded a CEO Great Place to Work For All Leadership Award by Great Place to Work.

Goodnight received the Order of the Long Leaf Pine in 2023. He was ranked #79 on the Forbes 250 list of America’s Greatest Innovators.

== Personal life ==
Goodnight met his wife, Ann, while he was a senior at North Carolina State University and she was attending Meredith College. They have been married for over 50 years and have three children, including real estate redeveloper and historic preservationist James Goodnight.

=== Rock collection ===
Goodnight has an interest in rock collecting. As a child, Goodnight would collect quartzes and arrowheads in the Greensboro area. He rediscovered his interest in geology in adulthood and began collecting rare rocks and other natural objects. In addition to minerals, he has also collected fossilized wood, dinosaur eggs and arrowheads from the Archaic period in North Carolina (dating between 8,000 BC and 1,000 BC). His collection includes hundreds of pieces, coming from over 40 countries. Goodnight has described rocks and minerals as a genre of art.

Parts of the collection are exhibited on the SAS campus in Cary, North Carolina. The display has been described as "a testament to his love of unique pieces of earth, from petrified dinosaur eggs, to impressive, mosaic chunks of native granite, to large, glassy meteorites." Goodnight has loaned pieces from his collection to the North Carolina Museum of Natural Sciences for the enjoyment of the public. A selection of pieces are displayed in the Betsy M. Bennett Bridge to Discovery, which links the museum to its Nature Research Center.

=== Wealth and philanthropy ===
In April 2023, Goodnight's net worth was estimated at US$7.4 billion, making him the richest person in North Carolina, ahead of Epic Games' Tim Sweeney. The Bloomberg Billionaires Index estimated his net worth to be US$18.5 billion as of 2025.

Goodnight has an interest in improving the state of education, particularly elementary and secondary education. He has advocated for increased funding for STEM education in the United States to prevent brain-drain and the outsourcing of research and technology jobs to other countries. In 1996, Goodnight and his wife, along with his business partner, John Sall and his wife Ginger, founded an independent prep school Cary Academy. He has advocated for restructuring preschool funding in North Carolina to extend access to more children in the state.

The Goodnights have engaged in various philanthropic activities related to North Carolina State University. They created the Goodnight Scholarships, including the Goodnight Scholars Program and the Goodnight Transfer Scholars Program, which provides full tuition scholarships and development programs to students in STEM. Their endowments have also created the Goodnight Doctoral Fellowship, 28 named faculty positions, and a deanship at North Carolina State.

The Goodnights also founded the Goodnight Educational Foundation in 2005. The foundation has supported the North Carolina Independent Colleges and Universities' Science of Reading Initiative. In 2023, the Goodnight Distinguished Professorship in Early Literacy at Western Carolina University was established with a $1.5 million endowment from the foundation. Goodnight has also contributed to the William and Ida Friday Institute for Educational Innovation.

The Goodnights have also donated to causes such as wildlife conservation and historical preservation. They sponsored the Jim and Ann Goodnight Museum Park, part of the North Carolina Museum of Art in Raleigh. In 2018, Goodnight and his wife were awarded by the North Carolina Museum of History for their contributions to the preservation of North Carolina history. He is a patron of the Carolina Ballet.

Both of the Goodnights are also involved in the local Cary, North Carolina, community. He has invested heavily in real estate in Cary, which - in addition to tax revenue generated by SAS and the attraction of thousands of employees - has contributed to the town's growth since the 1970s. He has also invested in the development of the neighboring community of Chatham Park. He owns Prestonwood Country Club and The Umstead Hotel and Spa situated on the edge of the SAS campus. He also established Herons currently headed by Steven Devereaux Greene.

== See also ==
- List of Americans by net worth
- List of Tau Kappa Epsilon brothers
- Prestonwood Country Club
