= System 2000 =

System 2000 or similar may refer to:

- Federal Telecommunications System 2000, digital telecommunications service for the US federal government
- Satellite Control and Operation System 2000, a satellite Mission Control System software infrastructure from the European Space Agency
- Systema 2000 (also known as the Game Master), a monochrome handheld game console from the early 1990s
- System 2000 (software), a Database Management System (DBMS)
