= Tar Heel (disambiguation) =

Tar Heel (or Tarheel) is a nickname applied to the state and inhabitants of North Carolina as well as the nickname of the University of North Carolina athletic teams, students, alumni, and fans.

Tar Heel may also refer to:

== Athletics ==
- North Carolina Tar Heels, athletic teams of the University of North Carolina at Chapel Hill
- Tar Heel League, a defunct minor league baseball league

== Localities ==
- Tar Heel, North Carolina, a town in Bladen County
- Tarheel, North Carolina, an unincorporated community in western Gates County

== Other ==
- Tarheel Forensic League
- Tar Heel (horse), Standardbred racehorse winner of the Little Brown Jug
- The Carolina Tar Heels, an American old time string band active in the 1920s
