= USSES =

USSES is an acronym which may refer to:

- University Statisticians of the Southern Experiment Stations
- the U.S. Sheep Experiment Station
- the Usses (river), a tributary of the Rhône in Haute-Savoie, France
