= SAS Institute =

American IT and analytics company

Coordinates: 35°49′37″N 78°45′44″W

SAS Institute Inc.
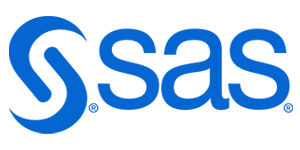

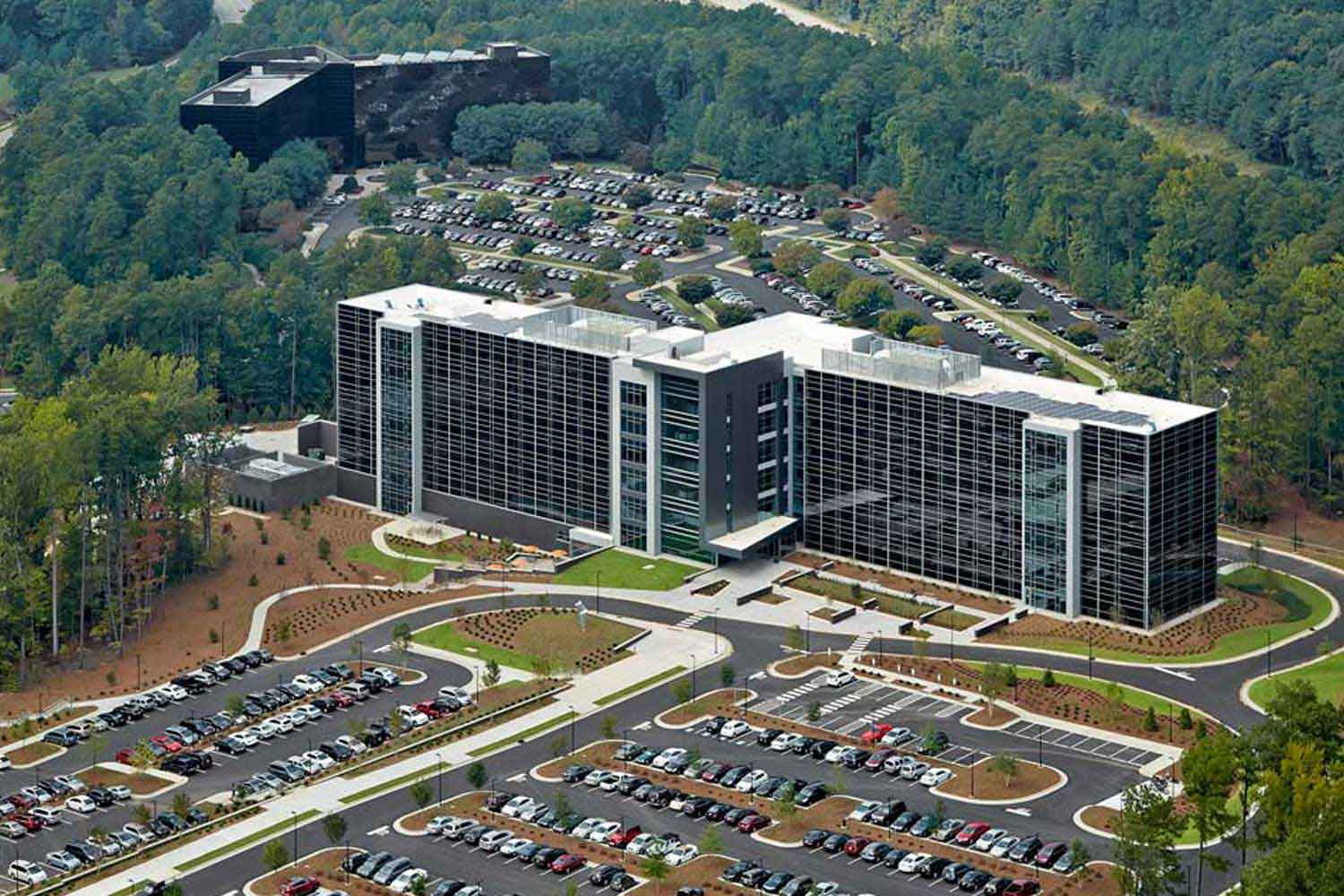
- Headquarters in Cary, North Carolina
- Type: Private
- Industry: Software
- Founded: July 1, 1976; 50 years ago
- Founders: Anthony James Barr; James Goodnight; John Sall; Jane Helwig
- Headquarters: Cary, North Carolina, U.S.
- Area served: Worldwide
- Key people: James Goodnight (CEO); John Sall (EVP)
- Products: SAS (software); SAS language SAS Viya; JMP
- Revenue: ▲US$ 3+ billion (2024)
- Number of employees: 12,170 (2025)
- Website: www.sas.com

SAS Institute Inc. (dba SAS /sæs/) is an American multinational developer of analytics and artificial intelligence software based in Cary, North Carolina. SAS develops and markets a suite of analytics software (also called SAS), which helps access, manage, analyze and report on data to aid in decision-making.

SAS Institute started as a project at North Carolina State University to create a statistical analysis system. SAS originally stood for "Statistical Analysis System", though it is no longer considered an acronym. It was originally used primarily by agricultural departments at universities in the late 1960s. It became an independent, private business led by current CEO James Goodnight and three other project leaders from the university in 1976.

SAS is one of the largest privately held software providers in the world, and the company's software is used by most of the Fortune 500 companies. The company's revenue grew from $10 million in 1980 to $3.2 billion in 2022. Historically, it has spent a notably higher proportion of its annual revenue on research and development than most other software companies.

== History ==
=== 1966–1979: Founding and early history ===
The Statistical Analysis System (SAS) began as a project at North Carolina State University's agricultural department. It was originally led by Anthony James Barr in 1966, then joined by NCSU graduate student James Goodnight in 1967 and John Sall in 1973. In the early 1970s, the software was primarily leased to other agricultural departments in order to analyze the effect soil, weather and seed varieties had on crop yields. The project was funded by the National Institutes of Health and later by a coalition of university statistics programs called the University Statisticians of the Southern Experiment Stations.

By 1976, the software had 100 customers and that year, 300 people attended the first SAS user conference in Kissimmee, Florida. Goodnight, Barr, Sall and another early participant, Jane Helwig, founded SAS Institute Inc. as a private company on July 1, 1976, in offices across the street from the university. Barr and Helwig later sold their interest in the company.

During its first year of operation, SAS adopted a tradition of polling users for suggestions to improve the software through the SASware Ballot. Many of the company's employee perks, such as fresh fruit, reasonable work hours and free M&M's every Wednesday became part of its practices that first year. In the late 1970s, the company established its first marketing department.

=== 1980–2018 ===
SAS started building its current headquarters in a forested area of Cary, North Carolina in 1980. Later that year, it began providing on-site daycare in order to keep an employee who had planned to leave her job to care for her child at home. By 1984, SAS had expanded the benefits programs it offered to employees and their families, and begun building a fitness center, medical center, on-site cafe and other facilities. SAS became known as a good place to work and was frequently recognized by national magazines like BusinessWeek, Working Mother and Fortune for its work environment.

The company began its relationship with Microsoft and development for Windows operating systems in 1989. Shortly afterwards it established partnerships with database companies like Oracle, Sybase and Informix.

During the 1980s, SAS was one of Inc. Magazine's fastest growing companies in America from 1979 and 1985. It grew more than ten percent per year from $10 million in revenues in 1980 to $1.1 billion by 2000. In 2007, SAS revenue was $2.15 billion, and in 2013 its revenue was $3.02 billion. By the late 1990s, SAS was the largest privately held software company. The Associated Press reported that analysts attributed the growth to aggressive research and development (R&D) spending. It had the highest ratio of its revenues spent on R&D in the industry for eight years, setting a record of 34 percent of its revenues in 1993, as it was working on a new menu-based interface. In 1998, a larger proportion of its revenue was spent on R&D than at most other software companies; in 1997, this figure was more than double the industry average.

SAS created an education division in 1997 to create software for schools, including the newly formed Cary Academy. In 2003 the Bank of America Foundation purchased and donated licenses for the software to 400 schools in North Carolina. SAS funded its first advertising program in 2000 with a $30 million television and radio campaign.

The company considered making 25 percent of its ownership stake available on the stock market and providing employees with stock-options during the dot-com bubble before the following downturn, but ultimately chose not to. SAS was one of the few technology companies that did well during the downturn and hired aggressively to take advantage of available staff.

In 2009, SAS filed a lawsuit against World Programming Ltd., alleging World Programming System—a software product designed to use the features of the SAS language—violated their copyright as it was reverse engineered from the functionality of SAS Learning Edition. The European Court of Justice ruled that functionality and language elements were not protected and the case was discussed in Oracle v. Google

SAS introduced its first reseller program intended to grow sales with small to medium-sized businesses in 2006. Leading up to 2007, SAS provided funding and curriculum assistance to help start the Master of Science in Analytics program at nearby North Carolina State University. The company's cloud-based products grew in revenues by 35 percent in 2014 and the construction of Building Q was completed late that year to house its corresponding operations.

In March 2014, SAS launched its SAS Analytics U initiative to provide free foundational technologies and support to teachers and students.

=== 2019–present: Artificial intelligence and international expansion ===
In 2019, SAS announced that it was investing $1 billion into further artificial intelligence R&D, as part of a broader push to develop software in the fields of machine learning, deep learning, computer vision and natural language processing. The investment will also fund related initiatives such as acquisitions and the creation of education programs to teach the public about the applications of AI.

SAS partnered with Microsoft in 2020 to allow users to run their SAS workloads in the cloud with Microsoft Azure. This partnership has also facilitated co-engineering between the companies in the areas of generative AI and data management, such as integration between OpenAI and SAS' analytical systems.

SAS also partnered with TMA Solutions in 2020, with the latter consulting on AI adoption. That year, SAS launched the SAS Software Certified Young Professionals in collaboration with Malaysia Digital Economy Corporation with the goal of training 500 students in programming, machine learning and analytics through online courses.

In May 2023, SAS announced its intentions to invest an additional $1 billion into AI applications for the banking, healthcare, and insurance industries over the next three years. The company's chief technology officer Bryan Harris stated that "[we] think this is where the second leg of growth of SAS over the next 50 years is going to be." This investment in AI contributed to the company's expansion in international markets, especially China.

The majority of this development has focused on the creation of "pragmatic" artificial intelligence with present-day applications. In addition to integrating artificial intelligence into its existing platforms, the company launched several new platforms related to AI development in 2023 and 2024, including SAS Viya Workbench, a development environment used for building AI models, and AI application development platform App Factory. It also launched Viya Copilot, a generative AI assistant for developers and data scientists.

SAS Data Maker, a synthetic data platform, was introduced in 2024. In November 2024, SAS acquired the United Kingdom-based synthetic data company Hazy. It was announced that the company would integrate Hazy's data generation capabilities into SAS Data Maker.

=== Initial public offering preparations ===
In July 2021, the Wall Street Journal reported that the semiconductor giant Broadcom was in talks to acquire SAS. In a July 13, 2021 email, SAS CEO Jim Goodnight stated that the company was not for sale.

In July 2021, SAS announced that it was preparing for an initial public offering (IPO). As of September 2023, the company had invested between $50 million and $60 million into internal preparations for its IPO, which was estimated to take place in 2025. Since then, the company has been overhauling its operations so that it can operate as a publicly traded company. It consolidated its financial systems into a new single new system, a process completed in January 2025.

In May 2025, the company appointed Gavin Day chief operating officer to oversee the company's IPO. Day has stated that the company plans to go public "when the market is ready", as the company has no debt and no financial pressure to go public by a specific date. That month, the company discussed its plans to go public as a way of planning the company's executive succession. The public offering would also allow the company to offer stock options to employees.

== Operations ==
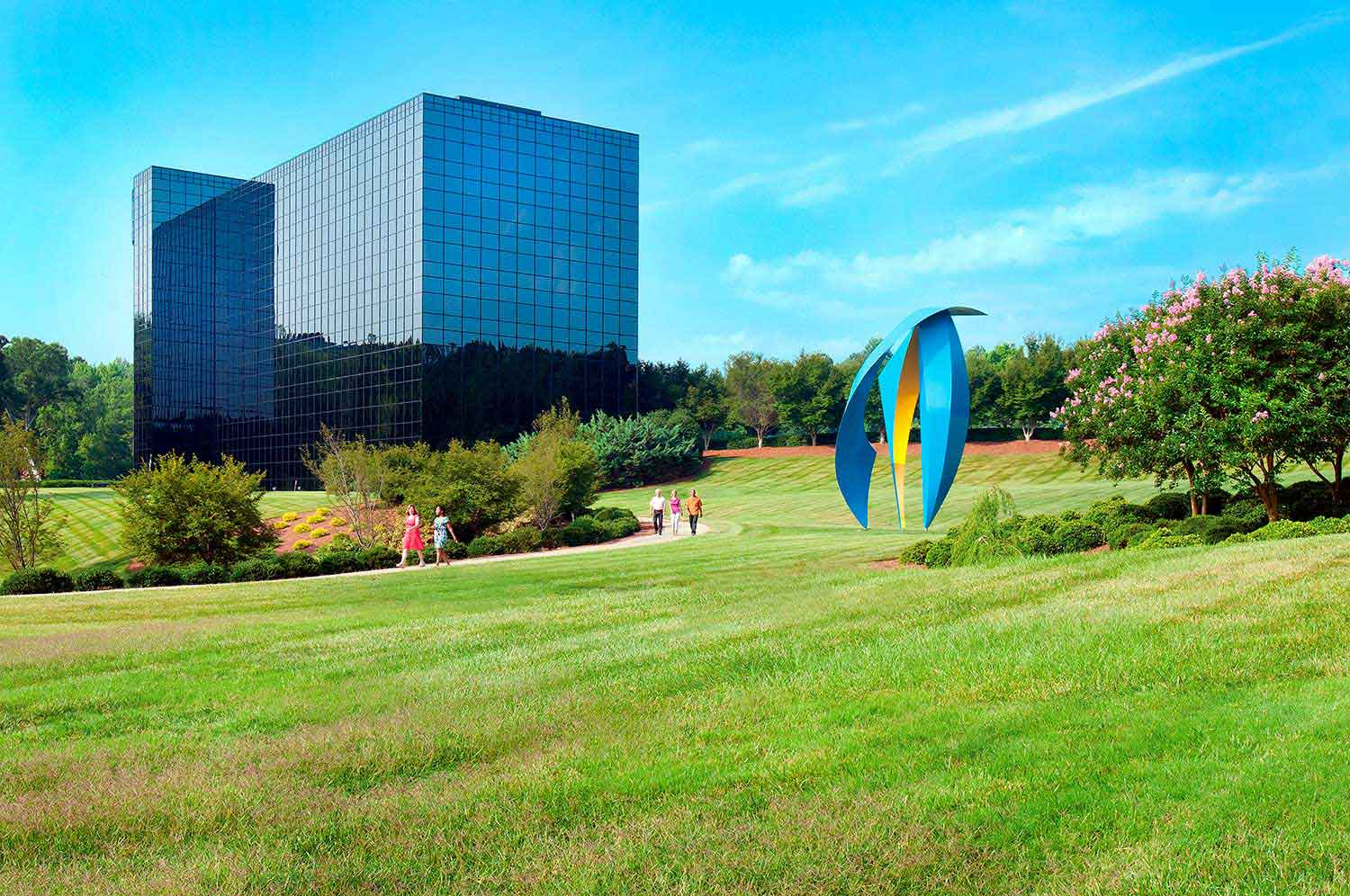
Building S

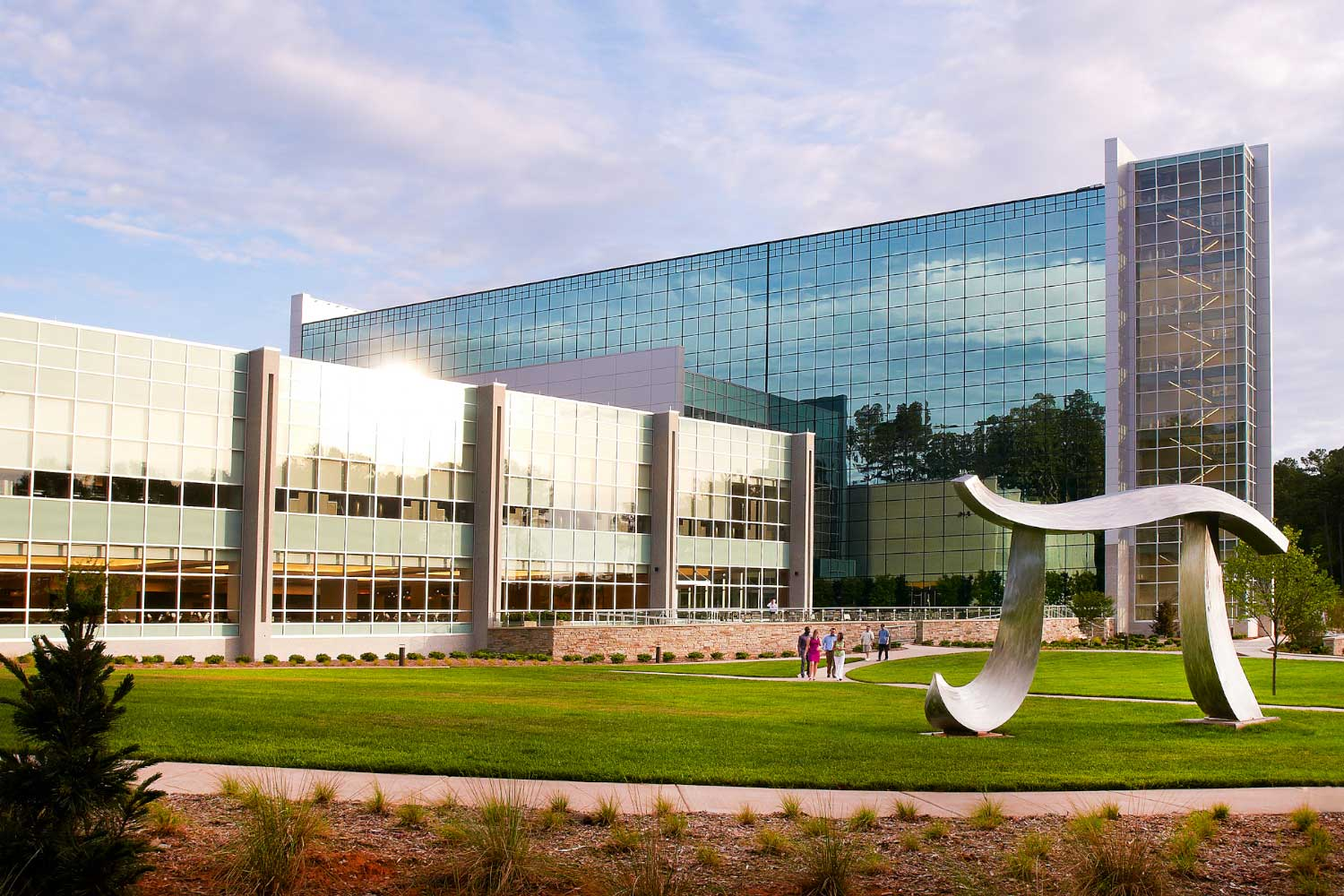
Building C pi sculpture

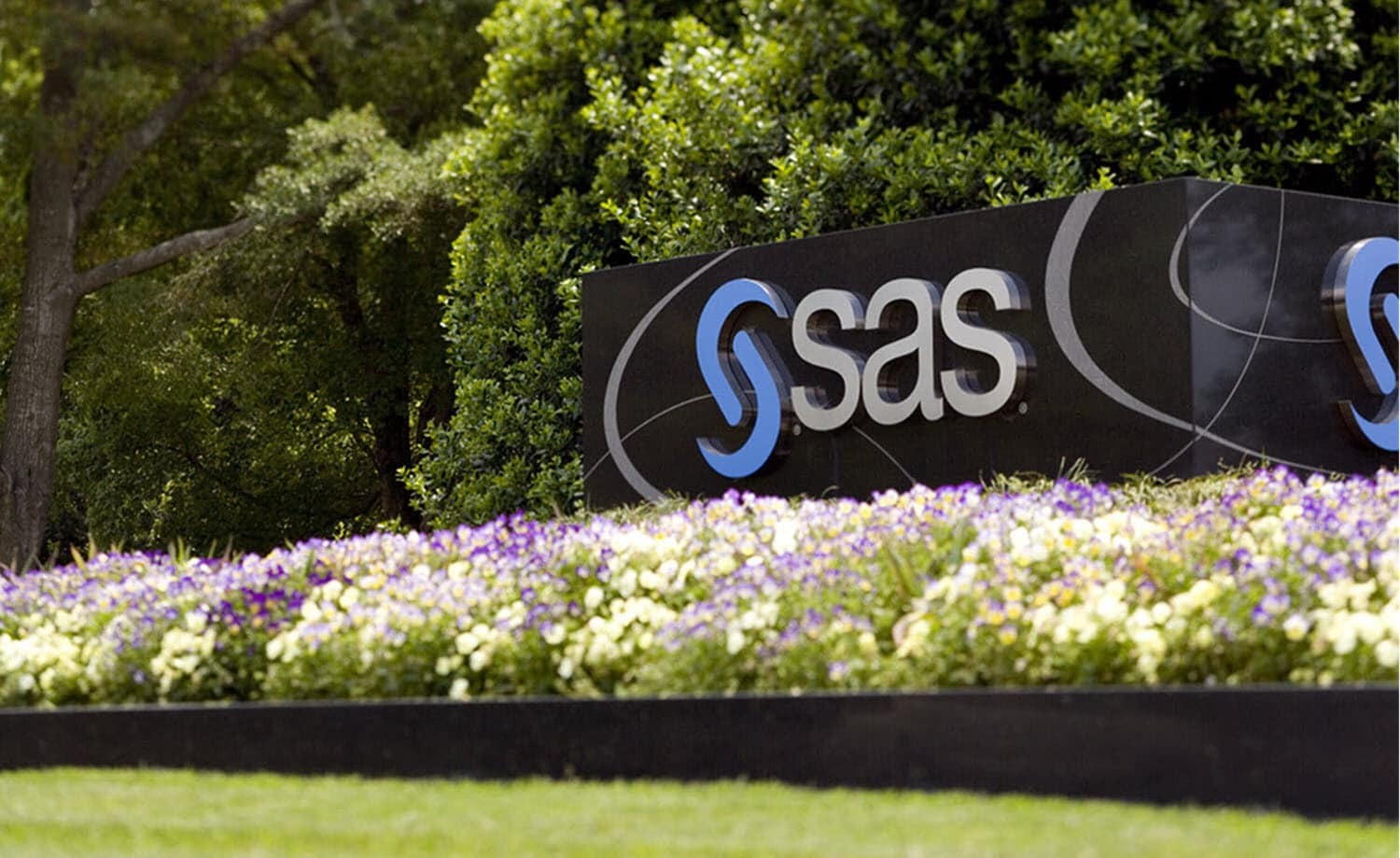
SAS Campus, Cary, North Carolina

SAS Institute has grown in revenue each year since it was incorporated in 1976. It generated over $3 billion in sales revenue in 2023. About 20-30% of the company's revenues are spent on research and development, which is the highest ratio among software companies of its size. In 1994, Computerworld found that out of the world's 50 largest software companies, SAS spent 2.5 times the industry average on R&D. It had customers in 145 countries as of 2019. As of 2010 revenues come relatively evenly from Europe, Africa, the Middle East and the Americas. According to the company's 2014 financial reporting, its revenues are currently 46.7 percent from the Americas, 41.4 from Europe, Middle East and Africa, and 11.9 percent from Asia-Pacific. SAS has about 5,200 employees at its headquarters in Cary, North Carolina, 1,600 employees elsewhere in the US and 6,900 in Europe, Asia, Canada or Latin America. CEO James Goodnight owns about two-thirds of the company and co-founder John Sall owns the other one-third. In 2022, the company was included on Forbes' list of the largest private companies in the United States, ranked by revenue. It was one of the largest privately held software providers in the world in 2023.

The company has contributed to the growth and economic development of Cary, attracting thousands of employees. Cary mayor Harold Weinbrecht and former mayor Koka Booth each worked at the company before entering politics.

== Workplace ==
SAS is well known for its workplace culture. The company was used as a model for workplace perks at Google and is taught as a case study in management seminars at Stanford. SAS was identified as a "Best Company to Work For" in Fortune's annual rankings from the list's inception in 1997 until 2021, but after slipping in rank has failed to make more recent lists. In 2014, SAS ranked No. 2 on the elite Top 25 World's Best Multinational Workplaces list from Great Place to Work as well as No. 2 among Fortune's 2014 Best Companies to Work For in the US. The company was No. 1 on Fortune's US list in 2010 and 2011. In 2015, Fortune ranked SAS No. 4 on its annual list of best companies to work for in the US; in 2016, SAS was No. 8 on the same list. It is also regularly in Working Mother Magazine's "100 Best Companies for Working Mothers" list.

=== Benefits ===
The SAS headquarters in Cary is situated on a 900-acre campus with various on-site services and amenities for employees. Buildings comprise about a third of the campus, while the remaining acreage is mostly green spaces and bodies of water which are accessible by trails. SAS offers on-site day care services to its employees for 850 children for about a third of the normal cost. Medical services are provided to employees and their families for free and 80% of the cost is covered for specialists. Employees are encouraged to work 35-hour weeks and have free access to a recreation and fitness center as well as life counseling services. It also hosts a summer camp for children and operates on-site cafeterias and cafes. 22.5 tons of M&Ms are provided each year, in jars that are re-filled every Wednesday. Similar amenities are provided at its other offices besides its headquarters.

95 percent of a company's assets drive out the front gate every night, the CEO must see to it that they return the following day.

— James Goodnight, quoted in Management: Inventing and Delivering Its Future

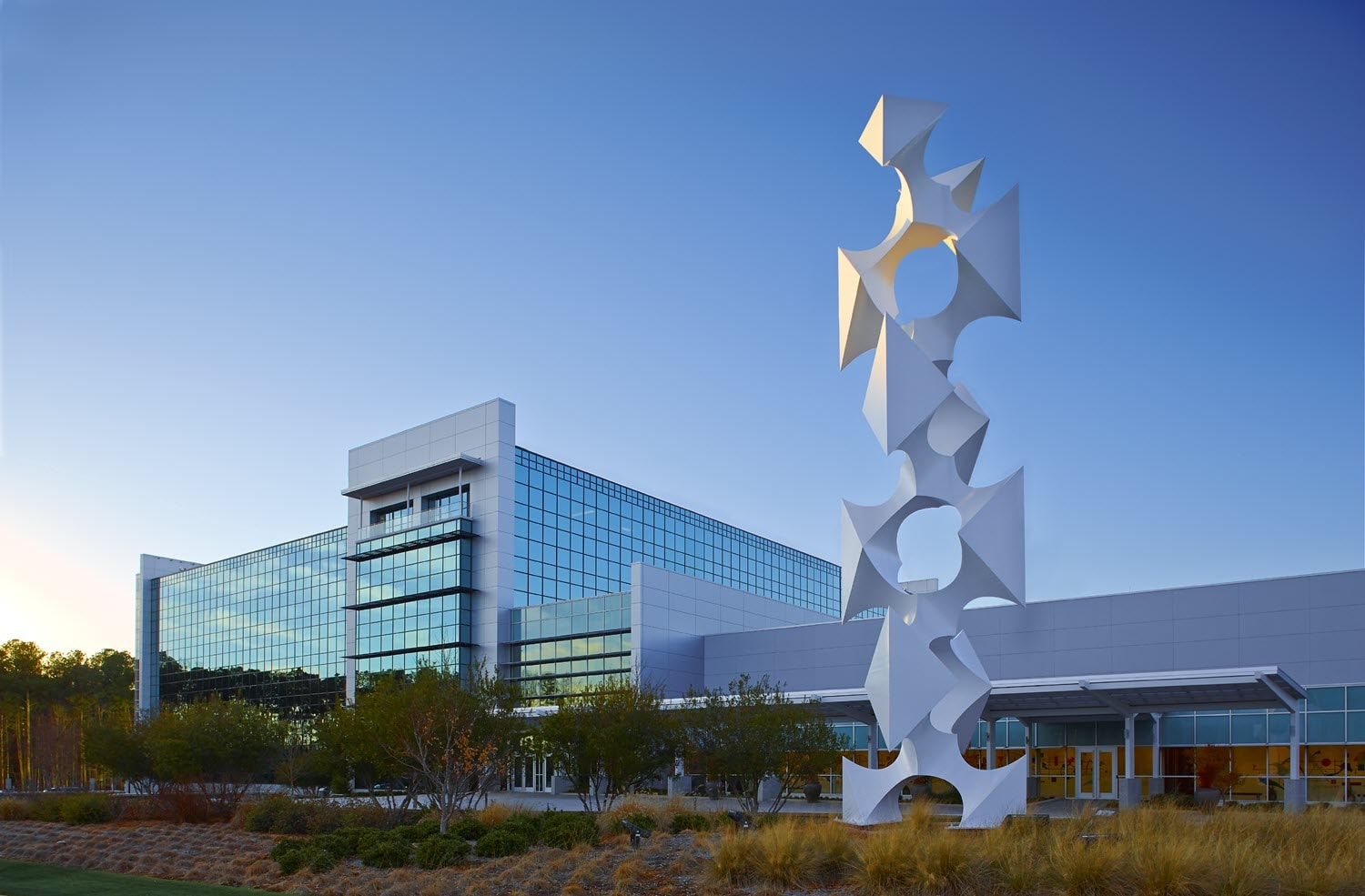
Building C

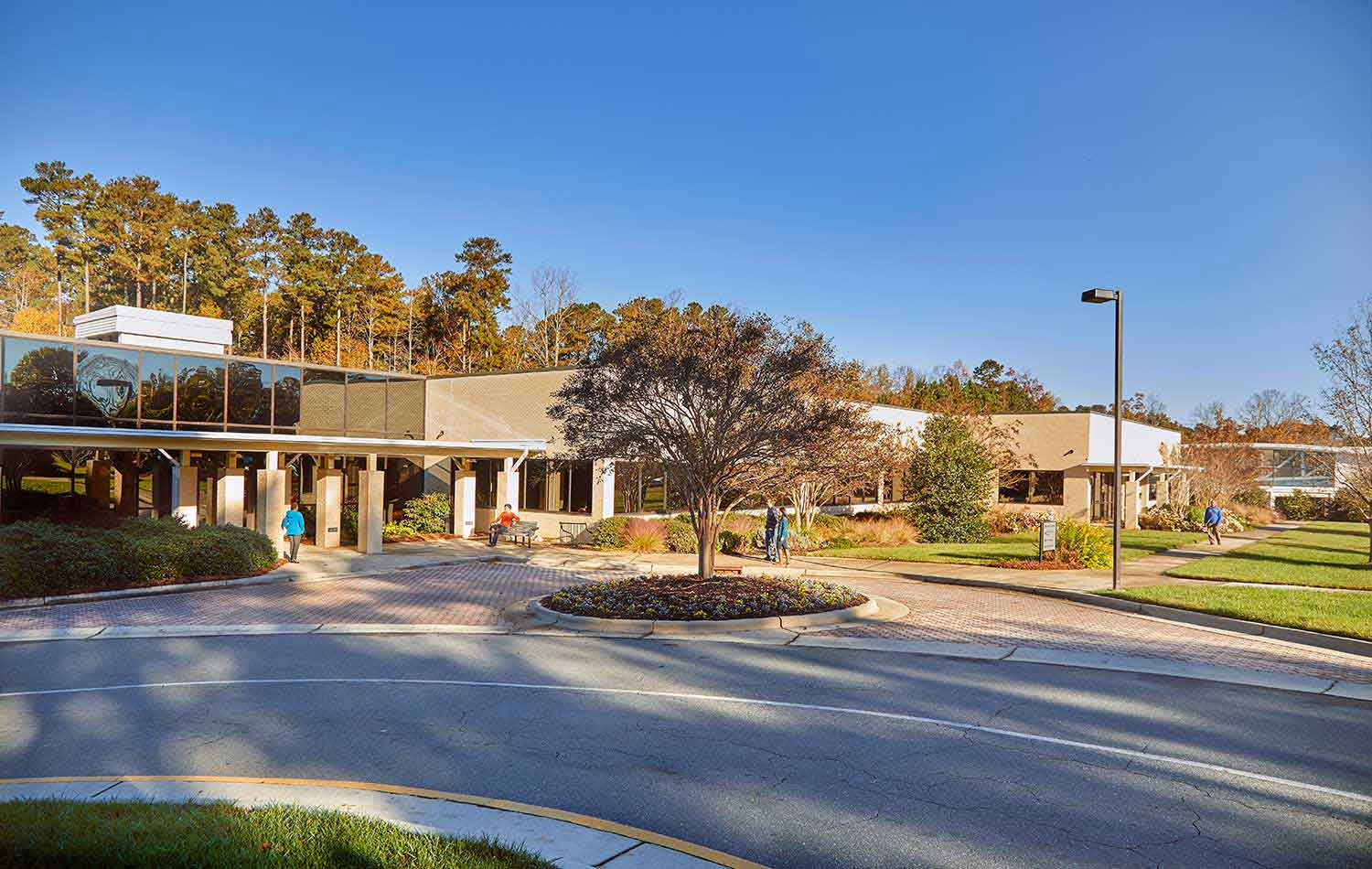
Healthcare center

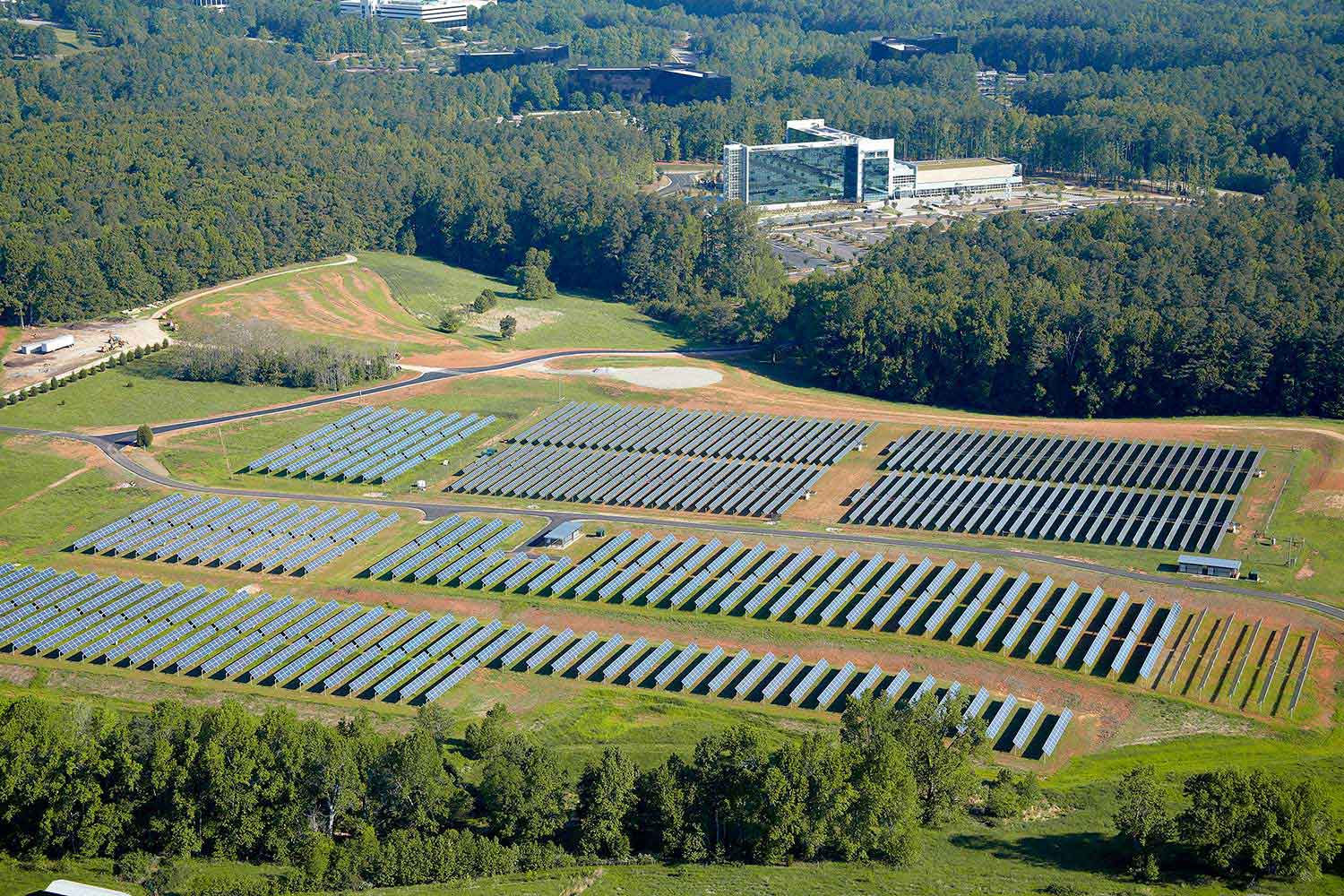
SAS Campus, Cary, NC

SAS spokespeople say its employee benefits are provided for business, not altruistic, reasons. The company evaluates new benefits using three criteria: whether it would benefit the company culture, whether it would serve a significant number of employees and whether it would save more money than is spent on it. According to academics, the company's practices improve the loyalty, focus and creativity of its staff. Professor Jeffrey Pfeffer from the Stanford Graduate School of Business estimated that the company saves $60–$80 million annually in expenses related to employee turnover. SAS has an annual employee turnover of three to five percent, while the software industry's average is 20 to 25 percent. According to USA Today, the workplace culture has created "intensely loyal" staff who care about the company's well-being. Even though there are unlimited sick days, the average employee takes only two. The 40,000 free medical visits provided to employees annually are estimated to cost the company US$4.5 million, but save it US$5 million due to the employee productivity lost when staff spend their work-hours in waiting rooms at other hospitals.

=== Structure and culture ===
SAS has a limited corporate hierarchy and an egalitarian culture. As the company grew it created new divisions, instead of layers of management, creating a flat, simple organizational structure. According to professor Jeffrey Pfeffer from Stanford, there are only three levels in the organization and CEO James Goodnight has 27 people who directly report to him. The organizational structure is fluid and employees can change roles rapidly.

Managers are involved in the day-to-day work with their employees. Employees are given a large extent of autonomy and developers are encouraged to pursue experimental product ideas. Input from customers guides the company's marketing and software development. According to SAS, 80 percent of suggestions for product improvements are incorporated into the software. The dress code is informal. According to Fast Company, employees describe the environment as "relaxed."

Employees are encouraged to do volunteer work and the company makes donation to non-profits where employees are involved. The company primarily focuses its philanthropic efforts on improving education. It funds pilot programs for new education models, donates laptops and provides free online software for classrooms called Curriculum Pathways. The company is a founding partner of the Watt Family Innovation Center at Clemson University, providing funding, access to software, and research.

== Acquisitions ==
Year	Company	Business	Country	References
2024	Hazy	Synthetic data technology	United States	
2022	Kamakura Corporation	Financial Risk Management	United States	
2021	Boemska	Data Analytics and Cloud Computing	United Kingdom	
2012	rPath, Inc.	Software appliance	United States	
2012	aiMatch, Inc.	Digital ad serving technology	United States	
2011	AssetLink	Integrated Marketing Management	United States	
2010	Vision Systems and Technology (VSTI)	Advanced Analytics Professional Services	United States	
2010	Memex	Intelligence Management Software	Scotland	
2008	Teragram	Natural Language Processing	United States	
2008	IDeaS	Revenue Management Software for the hospitality industry.	United States	
2006	Veridiem	Customer Intelligence	United States	
2003	Marketmax	Merchandise Planning and Analytics Software	United States	
2003	Risk Advisory	Risk Management	United States	
2003	OpRisk Analytics LLC	Management Consulting Services	United States	
2002	Verbind Software	Behavioral Tracking and Event-Triggering Software	United States	
2002	ABC Technologies Inc.	Software Developer and Wholesaler	United States	
2001	Intrinsic Ltd	Campaign Management Software	United Kingdom	
2000	DataFlux	Data Quality, Data Integration and Master Data Management	United States	
1997	Statview Life Sciences software from Abacus Concepts	Business Analytics	United States	
1993	GESCAN International, Inc.	Document and Workflow Management Systems	United States	
1988	NeoVisuals Inc.	3D Computer Graphics and Animation Software	United States	
1986	The Lattice C compiler, often considered the first C programming language on the IBM PC	C Compiler	United States	
1984	The System 2000 Database Management System from Intel Corporation	Database Management	United States	

== Software ==
It develops, supports and markets a suite of analytics software also called SAS (statistical analysis system), which captures, stores, modifies, analyzes and presents data. The SAS system and SAS programming language are used by most of the Fortune 500. The SAS software includes a Base SAS component that performs analytical functions and more than 200 other modules that add graphics, spreadsheets or other features.

Some of the uses for SAS' software include analyzing financial transactions for indications of fraud, optimizing prices for retailers, or evaluating the results of clinical trials. As of 2012, SAS is the largest market-share holder in the advanced analytics segment with a 36.2 percent share and the fifth largest for business intelligence software with a 6.9 percent share. SAS typically sells its software with an emphasis on subscription models that include support and updates, as opposed to software licenses.

=== SAS Viya ===
The company develops SAS Viya, an artificial intelligence and analytics platform that launched in 2016. The platform includes several modules for AI development, including Viya Workbench, Viya Copilot, and App Factory.

=== JMP ===
Under its subsidiary, JMP Statistical Discovery LLC, SAS Institute also sells the JMP suite of statistical analysis software, which consists of JMP, JMP Pro, JMP Clinical and JMP Genomics.

== User community ==
The SAS certification program was established in 1999. and SAS Publishing was created in 2000 as a separate entity that works to increase the availability of books related to SAS. SAS Publishing hosts an online bookstore, develops product documentation and publishes books on SAS authored by users. There are more than 200 SAS users groups devoted to a specialty, an individual client, or a geography. There are local, regional, national and international users groups.

== See also ==
- Revolution Analytics
