= Viya =

Viya may refer to:

- Viya, a form of the first name Abijah
- Viya language, a minor Bantu language of Gabon
- Viya!, 2001 solo album by Kâzım Koyuncu, Georgian singer-songwriter
- Viya (company), an American telecommunications company owned by ATN International
- Viya (influencer), a Chinese social media personality
- SAS Viya, artificial intelligence and analytics software
