= Matrix language =

Matrix language may refer to:

- Interactive Matrix Language
- Code-switching#Matrix language-frame model
