= FFS =

FFS is a commonly used initialism for "for fuck's sake". It is often said or typed as a form of minced oath by abbreviation. "FFS" may also refer to:

== Computing ==
- Feige–Fiat–Shamir identification scheme, in cryptography
- Find first set, a type of bit operation
- FreeFileSync, a software package

=== File systems ===
- Flash file system
- Formatted File System
- Amiga Fast File System
- Unix File System often called Fast File System

== Music ==
- FFS (band), a rock supergroup of Franz Ferdinand and Sparks
  - FFS (album), their debut album

== Organizations ==
=== Political organizations ===
- For our Future’s Sake, a UK campaign group calling for a public vote (People's Vote) on the final Brexit deal
- Social Forces Front (French: Front des Forces Sociales), a political party in Burkina Faso
- Socialist Forces Front (French: Front des Forces socialistes), a political party in Algeria

=== Other organizations ===
- Frankford Friends School, in Philadelphia, Pennsylvania, United States
- French Federation of Speleology
- Swiss Federal Railways (Italian: Ferrovie federali svizzere)

== Places ==
- FFS Arena, in Lund, Sweden
- Frankfurt South station, in Germany
- French Frigate Shoals, an island in the Northwestern Hawaiian Islands

== Science and technology ==
- Facial feminization surgery
- Free-fall sensor
- Fringe field switching
- Full flight simulator

== Other uses ==
- Farmer Field School, a community development process
- Fee-for-service, a payment model
- For Film's Sake, Australian women's film festival
- Fully fashioned stockings, stockings with reinforced toes and tops
