= Steven Devereaux Greene =

American chef and restaurateur

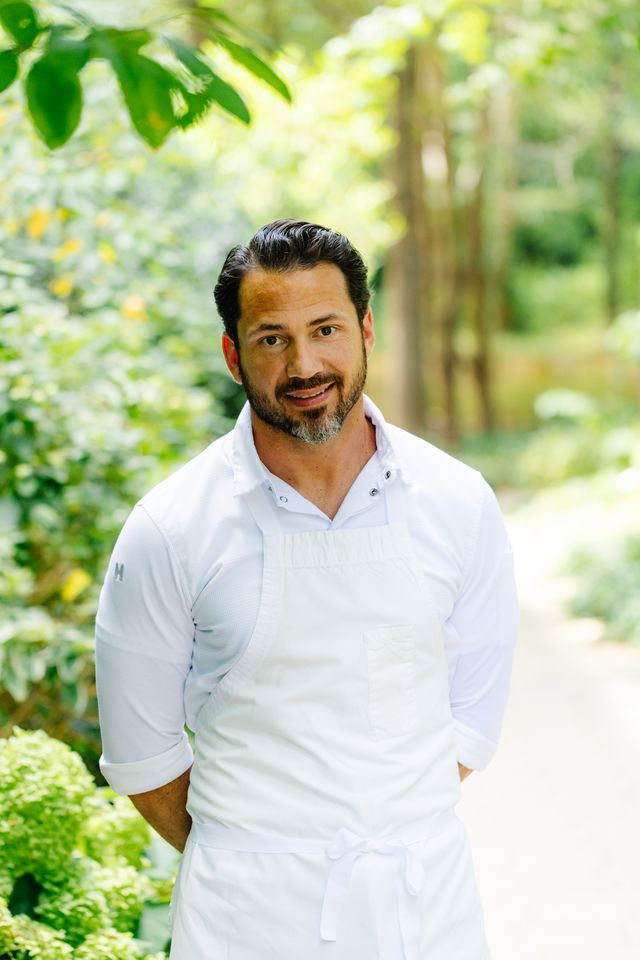
- Born: Ninety-Six, South Carolina
- Culinary career
- Cooking style: American cuisine
- Current restaurant: Herons (restaurant)
- Award(s) won: James Beard Foundation Award semifinalist (Best Chef: Southeast, five times)

Steven Devereaux Greene is an American chef. He has been a five time semifinalist for the James Beard Foundation Award for Best Chef: Southeast. His work and recipes have been featured in the Wall Street Journal, Forbes Travel Guide, Travel+ Leisure, News & Observer, Fortune, and Our State. He is known for his work in contemporary American regional cuisine. He is an executive chef at The Umstead Hotel & Spa in Cary, North Carolina

== Biography ==
Greene was born and raised in Ninety-Six, South Carolina. His professional career began with hands-on experience in various kitchens in the Southeastern United States. He started his culinary training at McCrady’s in Charleston, SC. then on to a role as chef de cuisine at the Dining Room at Woodlands Resort and Inn in Summerville, SC prior to opening his own restaurant, Devereaux’s in Greeneville SC, which became a local establishment. His early work earned him a “Rising Star” recognition from Restaurant Hospitality in 2008.

In 2009, Greene joined Herons at The Umstead Hotel & Spa as chef de cuisine, contributing to the restaurant's development and guiding it to its first Forbes Travel Guide Five-Star rating during his tenure. He briefly left in 2012 to serve as executive chef of An New World Cuisine in Cary, North Carolina, where the restaurant received five stars from The News & Observer and was named among the region's top dining destinations. Greene returned to The Umstead in 2014 as executive chef, taking over leadership of Herons and the hotel's culinary operations. During his tenure his restaurant received Forbes Travel Guide Five-Star Award and AAA Five Diamond Award, and its wine program has received the Wine Spectator Best of Award of Excellence.

In 2025, Greene was named a Krug Ambassade, a designation given by Krug Champagne to chefs associated with the brand's international culinary program.

== Awards ==
Greene has been a multiple-year semifinalist for the James Beard Foundation's Best Chef: Southeast award, including nominations in 2016, 2017, 2019, 2020 and 2026.

Additionally, Greene has twice represented his work at the James Beard House in New York City.

Greene is also a member of the Culinary Council of the Ment'or BKB Foundation, a nonprofit organization that supports professional culinary education and the United States team competing in the Bocuse d'Or.
