= SAS Institute Inc v World Programming Ltd =

2009 lawsuit by SAS Institute against World Programming

- European Court of Justice

Submitted 11 August 2010 Decided 2 May 2012
- Case: C-406/10
- CelexID: 62010CJ0406
- ECLI: ECLI:EU:C:2012:259
- Case type: Reference for a preliminary ruling
- Chamber: Grand Chamber

Ruling
- 1. Neither the functionality of a computer program nor the programming language and the format of data files in order to exploit its functions constitute a form of expression of that program and are not protected by copyright.; 2. Licensed software users may observe, study, or test the functioning of the program to determine the ideas and principles which underlie its elements on condition that that person does not infringe the exclusive rights of the copyright owner.; 3. Reproduction, in a computer program or user manual for that program, of elements described in the user manual for another computer program protected by copyright can infringe on the copyright in the latter if that reproduction constitutes the expression of the intellectual creation of the author of the user manual for the computer program protected by copyright.

Court composition
- President; Vassilios Skouris
- Judge Rapporteur; George Arestis
- Judges: Antonio Tizzano; José Narciso da Cunha Rodrigues; Koen Lenaerts; Jean-Claude Bonichot; Sacha Prechal; Rosario Silva de Lapuerta; Hermann Theodor Schiemann; Aindrias Ó Caoimh; Lars Bay Larsen; Maria Berger; Egidijus Jarašiūnas
- Advocate General; Yves Bot

Instruments cited
- 91/250/EEC and 2001/29/EC

SAS Institute Inc. v World Programming Ltd (2012) C-406/10 was a decision of the European Court of Justice which established that copyright protection does not extend to software functionality, programming languages, and file types.

In September 2009, the American SAS Institute, which has developed the SAS software suite since 1976, sued the British company World Programming in a copyright infringement claim against the World Programming System. The SAS Institute claimed that World Programming had copied SAS' software manuals and used SAS Learning Edition licenses to reverse engineer the program for their competing statistical analysis software.

Since World Programming lacked access to the SAS Institute's source code, the European Court of Justice the court considered the merits of a copyright claim based on observing functionality only. The European Committee for Interoperable Systems say that the case is important to the software industry.

The EU Court of Justice ruled that copyright protection does not extend to the software functionality, the programming language used and the format of the data files used by the program. It stated that there is no copyright infringement when a company which does not have access to the source code of a program studies, observes, and tests that program to create another program with the same functionality.

== England and Wales High Court ==
In July 2010, the England and Wales High Court's Chancery Division ruled that World Programming had not infringed on the SAS Institute's copyright over the SAS software suite and its software manuals by producing the World Programming System, nullifying the SAS Learning Edition license agreement's prohibition on reverse engineering. However, Justice Richard Arnold determined that World Programming's manual had infringed on the SAS manual's copyright by substantially reproducing its language.

Justice Arnold cited the Wikipedia entry on the SAS language to argue that the SAS Institute's product is a programming language, therefore lacking copyright protection as per the 2004 ruling in Navitaire Inc v easyJet Airline Co Ltd. The decision referred interpretation of the Computer Programs Directive (91/250/EEC) and Copyright and Information Society Directive (2001/29/EC) to the European Court of Justice.

== European Court of Justice ==
Responding to England and Wales High Court's request for a preliminary ruling interpreting the Computer Programs Directive (91/250/EEC) and Copyright and Information Society Directive (2001/29/EC), Advocate General Yves Bot delivered his Opinion on 29 November 2011.

In its full judgement handed down on 2 May 2012, the European Court of Justice concluded that:

1. Neither the functionality of a computer program nor the programming language and the format of data files in order to exploit its functions constitute a form of expression of that program and are not protected by copyright.
2. Licensed software users may observe, study, or test the functioning of the program to determine the ideas and principles which underlie its elements on condition that that person does not infringe the exclusive rights of the copyright owner.
3. Reproduction, in a computer program or user manual for that program, of elements described in the user manual for another computer program protected by copyright can infringe on the copyright in the latter if that reproduction constitutes the expression of the intellectual creation of the author of the user manual for the computer program protected by copyright.

== England and Wales Court of Appeal ==
Applying the European Court of Justice's ruling, Justice Arnold of the England and Wales High Court reinstated his dismissal of all copyright infringement claims except the World Programming System's manual infringing on the SAS software suite's manual.

In 2018, Judge Sara Cockerill of the England and Wales High Court's Commercial Court denied enforcement of the American judgement in England because the British courts had dismissed the breach of contract claim that the North Carolina jury had relied on. Based on the 1980 Protection of Trading Interests Act, Judge Cockerill allowed World Programming to recover non-compensatory damages paid under the American judgement.

== United States ==
In January 2010, the SAS Institute sued World Programming in the US District Court for Eastern North Carolina for similar claims of violating the SAS Learning Edition licensing agreement by reverse engineering the software and infringing on SAS' copyright by developing the World Programming System. In 2012, World Programming's forum non conveniens argument that the ongoing British court case was available, adequate, and more convenient than relitigating the claims in American courts was rejected on appeal by the US Court of Appeals for the Fourth Circuit because in the United States, plaintiffs are presumed to prefer litigation in their home country.

Based on the appeal, the US District Court for Eastern North Carolina granted summary judgment denying the copyright infringement, tortious interference with contract, and tortious interference with prospective economic advantage claims. Additionally, the district court provided partial summary judgement granting the breach of contract claim. The claims of copyright infringement of the SAS manuals, fraudulent inducement, and unfair deceptive trade practices were addressed in a jury trial in late 2015.

== US lawsuit (subsequent filing) ==
A subsequent US case filed by SAS Institute against WPL was won by SAS. After a three-week trial that ended on October 9, 2015, a jury in federal court awarded SAS $79.1 million in damages, after trebling. The jury ruled that WPL had engaged in unfair and deceptive trade practices - specifically, that it had misrepresented its intentions in order to obtain the license to the software, and violated the contract granted, which only allowed for non-commercial use - and that it had infringed on the copyright of its manual by copying portions of it into its own manual. However, Judge Flanagan ruled against SAS in summary judgement that WPL had infringed on the copyright of SAS's software. WPL then announced its intention to appeal.

== Impact ==
In Oracle America Inc. v. Google Inc., Judge William Alsup of the Northern District of California asked both parties to comment on the European Court of Justice's SAS Institute v World Programming ruling in regard to Oracle's claim that Google had infringed on its copyright by using the Java programming language's application programming interfaces (APIs) in early versions of the Android operating system. In 2021, the Supreme Court's Google LLC v. Oracle America, Inc. decision ultimately concluded that Google's use of the Java source code constituted fair use.
