= Cary Academy =

Private school in Cary, North Carolina

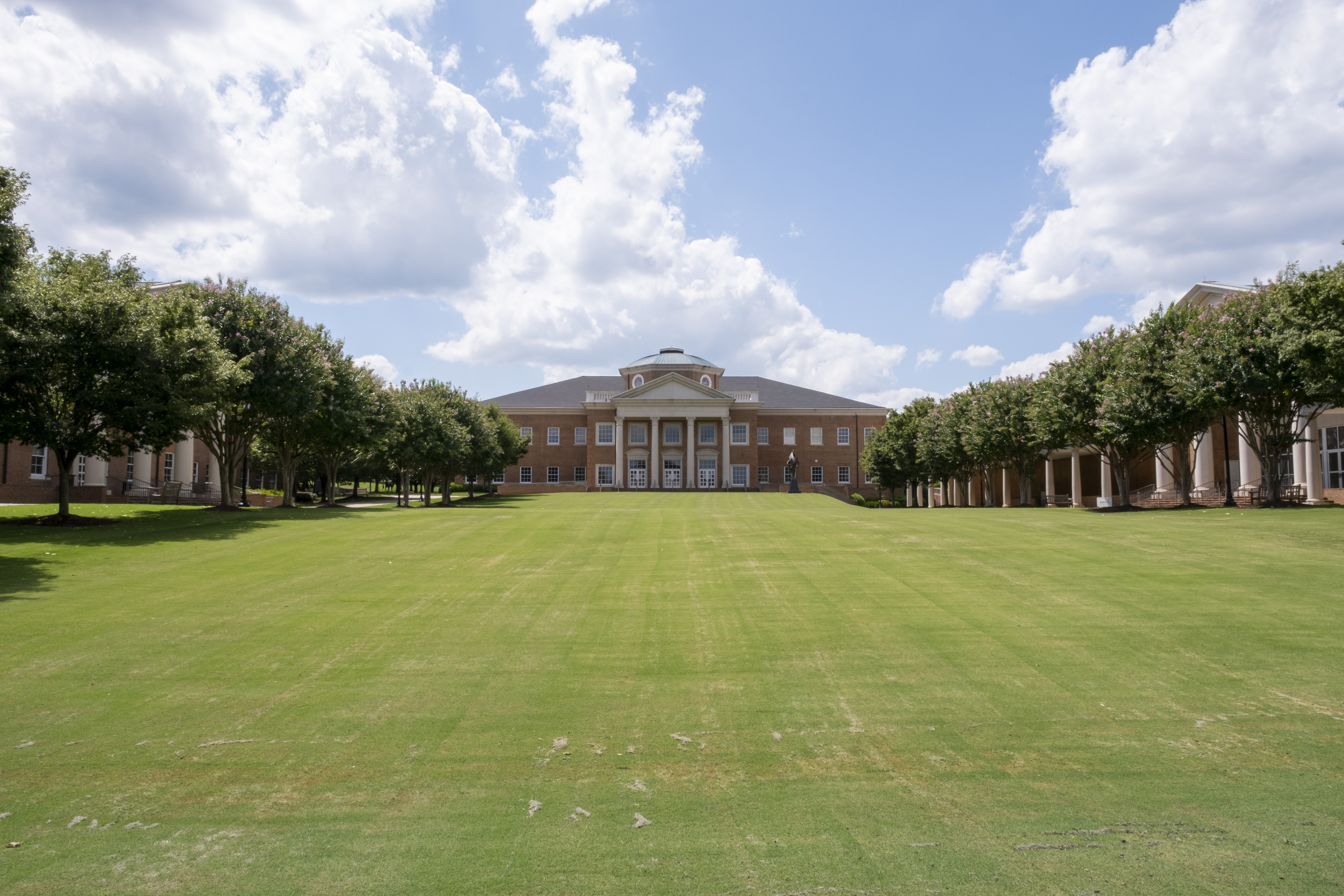
- Cary Academy main quad

Location
- 1500 North Harrison Avenue; Cary, North Carolina 27513; United States; 35°49′12″N 78°46′9″W

Information
- Type: Private
- Motto: Discovery, Innovation, Collaboration, and Excellence
- Opened: 1997
- Founder: Ann Goodnight; James Goodnight; Ginger Sall; John Sall
- CEEB code: 340601
- NCES School ID: A9903317
- Head of school: Dr. Michael Ehrhardt
- Teaching staff: 77.9
- Grades: 6–12
- Enrollment: 773
- Student to teacher ratio: 9.9:1
- Campus size: 52 acres (210,000 m^{2})
- Campus type: Suburban
- Colors: Blue and gold
- Athletics: North Carolina Independent Schools Athletic Association (NCISAA)
- Mascot: Charger
- Accreditation: Southern Association of Independent Schools
- Yearbook: Kaleidoscope
- Tuition: $34,000
- Affiliation: National Association of Independent Schools
- Website: www.caryacademy.org

Cary Academy is an independent, coeducational, nonsectarian, college-preparatory secondary school located in Cary, North Carolina. The school emphasizes the use of technology in the classroom, the arts, and foreign exchange.

== History ==
Cary Academy was founded by Ann and James Goodnight and Ginger and John Sall in 1996, though the first classes were not held until 1997. Goodnight and Sall are co-founders of SAS Institute. The school was founded on the motto “Discovery, Innovation, Collaboration, and Excellence." SAS continues to support the school through a scholarship program.

The school has a 65–acre campus. The school buildings are in the neoclassical style with ornate columns at entrances. It was modeled after the University of Virginia and was designed by Cherry Huffman architects of Raleigh, North Carolina. In 2003, the Sports and Education Annex was completed, allowing more space for both athletics and foreign language classes with a second gym and additional classroom space. Later, a 22,500 ft^{2} STEM center was added to the Sports and Education Annex, including a STEM innovation lab, six wet and dry laboratories, preparation rooms, and common areas for students.

In September 2004, the United States Department of Education named Cary Academy one of 255 public and private schools that had won its No Child Left Behind Blue Ribbon award since the inception of the program.

In July 2011, the original head of the school, Don Berger, announced his stepping down after the 2011–12 school year. He was replaced by Dr. Michael Ehrhardt in July 2013.

In January 2019, the 24,000-square-foot Center for Math and Science was completed, providing a maker space, classrooms, a greenhouse, and laboratories. That same year, the library was also renovated and the track was upgraded.

== Demographics ==
The demographic breakdown of the 777 students enrolled for the 2021–22 school year was Asian 202 (26.1%), Black 60 (7.8%), Hispanic 31 (4%), Native Hawaiian/Pacific islanders 1 (.1%), White 417 (53.9%), and Multiracial 62 (8%). The school has a minority enrollment of 46.1%. The student gender division is 52% female and 48% male.

In 2022, tuition was $26,995 with 14% of students receiving an average allocation of $18,105 in financial aid.

== Rankings ==
Niche gives Cary Academy an overall ranking of A+. Niche also ranks the school as #1 in private high schools in North Carolina. The school is the 20th largest private high school in North Carolina.

== Academics ==
Cary Academy includes grades six through twelve. It is accredited by the Southern Association of Colleges and Schools.

=== Arts ===
The school's art courses include architecture, ceramics, computer animation, design, drawing/sketching, graphics, painting, photography, sculpture, technical design and production, textiles, and video and film production. In addition, the school's music courses include band, choir/chorus, jazz band, and orchestra. Cary Academy also offers performance arts courses including creative writing, dance, drama, poetry.

=== Foreign language and exchange ===
The school offers four language courses—Chinese-Mandarin, French, German, and Spanish—starting in middle school. In addition, a foreign exchange program that allows 100 upper school students to travel to Argentina, Germany, Ecuador, China, or France each year. Between 95 and 98% of students participate in this program.

=== Technology ===
From its inception, Cary Academy has placed a heavy emphasis on technology. From 1997 until 2006, Cary Academy featured desktop computers in every classroom, as per the "one-computer-per-student" policy in use at the time. For the 2006–07 school year, these were replaced with tablet PCs issued to every student.

== Extracurricular activities ==
=== Athletics ===
Cary Academy is a Division 1 member of the North Carolina Independent Schools Athletic Association (NCISAA). It is also a member of the Capital Area Middle School Conference.

Boys athletic teams include baseball, basketball, cross country, golf, lacrosse, soccer, swimming, tennis, track and field, and wrestling. Girls athletic teams include basketball, cross country, cheerleading, field hockey, golf, lacrosse, soccer, softball, swimming, tennis, track and field, and volleyball.

==== NCISAA State Championships ====
- Boys Cross Country 2017, 2024
- Boys Swim Team 2015, 2019
- Girls Swim Team, 2017, 2018, 2019, 2020, 2021, 2022
- Girls Track and Field, 2012
- Varsity Girls Cross Country 2006, 2012, 2017
- Varsity Boys Tennis Team 2008, 2009, 2014, 2015

=== Clubs ===
Student clubs include the Art Club, the Chess Club, Community Service Club, the Drama Club, Foreign Language and Culture Clubs (Covering Chinese, Spanish, French, and German), Investment Club, Math Club, National Honor Society, the Robotics Club (FRC #5160), SADD, the Science Club, Speech and Debate Team, Sports Marketing Club, STAR, Tech Club, USAYPT, the Step Team, Student Council / Government, and the ACSL Club.

=== Publications ===
Cary Academy has a Literary Magazine, a student newspaper called The Campitor, and yearbook called The Legacy.

=== Speech and Debate ===
Cary Academy's Speech and Debate Team participates in the Tarheel Forensic League (TFL), the National Speech and Debate Association (NSDA), and the National Catholic Forensics League (NCFL). At the 2004, 2024, and 2025 TFL North Carolina State Championships, the team won the Governor's Cup for best overall results. The NSDA recognized Cary Academy with the Leading Chapter Award for the Tarheel East District in 2007, 2013, 2018, and 2024. The NSDA also named Cary Academy #28 on their Top 100 Schools list for the 2020–21 school year.

==== North Carolina State Championships ====
- NC Congressional Debate State Champion: 2014
- NC Declamation State Champion: 2022, 2023, 2024
- NC Dramatic Interpretation State Champion: 2023
- NC Duo Interpretation State Champion: 2023
- NC Extemporaneous Speaking State Champion: 2003, 2004, 2024, 2025
- NC Impromptu Speaking State Champion: 2021, 2022, 2025
- NC Informative Speaking State Champion: 2021, 2022, 2024
- NC Lincoln Douglas Debate State Champion: 2004, 2007, 2008, 2014
- NC Public Forum Debate State Champion: 2008

==== State Championship Team Awards ====
- Governor's Cup (Overall Sweepstakes): 2004, 2024, 2025
- Steven Davis Debate Sweepstakes: 2025
- Kurt Earnest Speech Sweepstakes: 2022, 2023, 2024, 2025
- Randy Shaver Small–Program Sweepstakes: 2011

==== State Championship Individual Awards ====
- Virginia Sutherland Circle of Honor (Hall of Fame): Carole Hamilton (2015)
- John Woollen TFL Student of the Year: Ritvik Nalamouthu (2021)

== Notable alumni ==
- Alex ter Avest, actress
- Charlotte Hook, swimmer
- Travis May, technology company founder and president
- Trey Murphy III, professional basketball player
- Laney Rouse, National Women's Soccer League player

== Notable faculty ==
- Mindaugas Timinskas, former varsity basketball head coach and former professional basketball player
