= Herons (restaurant) =

- Interactive map of Herons

Restaurant information
- Established: 2007
- Owners: Ann and Jim Goodnight
- Chef: Steven Devereaux Greene
- Food type: Southern
- Location: 100 Woodland Pond Dr, Cary, North Carolina, United States
- Coordinates: 35.8295°N 78.7645°W

Herons is a fine-dining restaurant located in Cary, North Carolina, established in 2007.Since its opening in 2007, Herons has received significant industry recognition, Herons has received industry recognition including Forbes Travel Guide Five-Star Award, News & Observer Restaurant of the Year, AAA Five Diamond Award and several James Beard Award semifinalist nominations for its executive chef. The restaurant is also listed in the Michelin Guide as a Michelin Guide recommended establishment.

== History ==
Herons opened in 2007 as the restaurant of The Umstead Hotel & Spa in Cary, North Carolina. The hotel was developed by Ann and Jim Goodnight, founders of SAS Institute. Herons was intended to be a fine-dining venue emphasizing local ingredients, Southern culinary traditions, and contemporary American cuisine.

It is currently headed by Executive Chef Steven Greene, a native of South Carolina and a James Beard Award semifinalist for Best Chef: Southeast.

== Menu ==
The menus at Herons frequently change with the seasons and emphasize locally sourced, contemporary American cuisine, featuring refined dishes such as oysters Bienville, tuna tartare, and seasonal vegetable compositions, alongside thoughtfully prepared seafood and meat offerings.

Herons sources a significant portion of its produce from One Oak Farm, a three-acre sustainable farm associated with The Umstead Hotel & Spa, with up to approximately 70 % of produce coming from the farm during peak season.

== Recognition and reception ==
Herons is listed in the Michelin Guide (American South) as a Michelin-recommended restaurant.

The restaurant has received the Forbes Travel Guide Five-Star Award since at least 2012. It has also been awarded the AAA Five Diamond Award.

Herons’s wine program has received the Wine Spectator Best of Award of Excellence.

Herons has received recognitions, from News & Observer Restaurant of the Year in multiple years and inclusion in USA Today’s Thirty Best Restaurants in America lists.
