= Anthony James Barr =

American programming language designer, software engineer and inventor (born 1940)

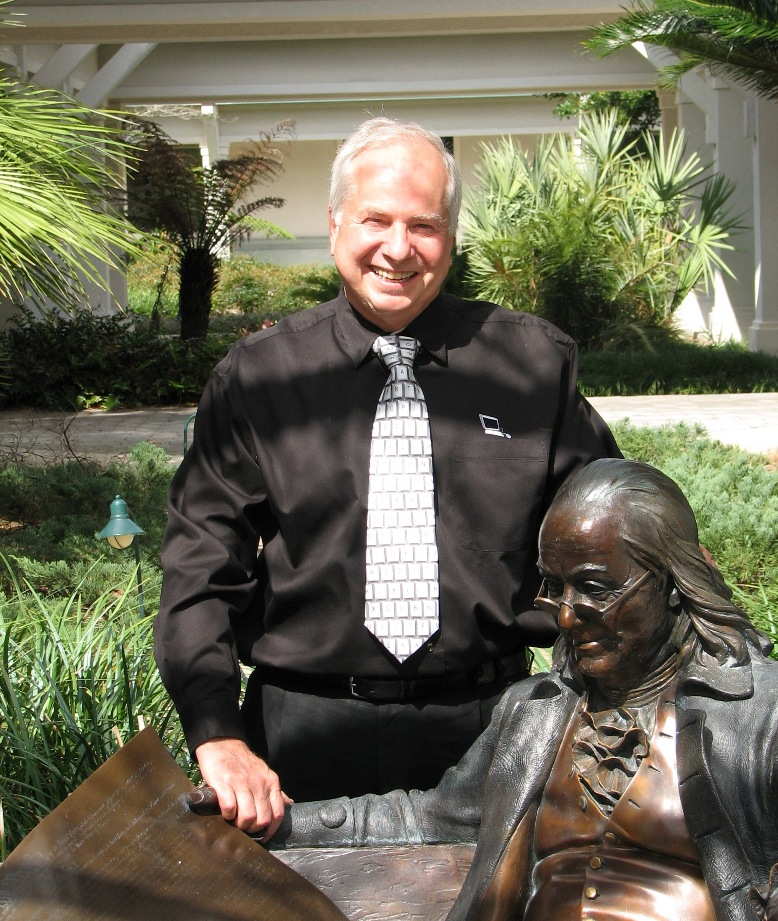
- Barr with statue of Benjamin Franklin on the Barr Systems campus in Gainesville, Florida
- Born: September 24, 1940 (age 86); New York
- Other names: Tony Barr, Jim Barr
- Education: North Carolina State University
- Occupations: Programming language designer, Software engineer, Inventor

Anthony James Barr (born September 24, 1940), aka Tony Barr or Jim Barr, is an American programming language designer, software engineer, and inventor. He is best known for developing the SAS software suite and for co-founding SAS Institute. SAS software is used for data management, analytics, and artificial intelligence. Among his other notable contributions are techniques for automated lumber yield optimization and the Automated Classification of Medical Entities (ACME).

== Early life and education ==
Barr was born in New York City, in 1940, and raised in Summit, New Jersey. Growing up, he was inspired by the biographies of Ben Franklin, Marconi, Alexander Graham Bell, Wright Brothers, and Sikorsky, as well as visits to the Franklin Institute in Philadelphia and the Museum of Natural History in New York City.

Barr graduated from Summit High School in 1958. He received a BS in Applied Physics (with honors) at North Carolina State University in 1962, during which time he began an assistantship at the NCSU Computing Center. In 1963, he received a National Science Foundation Fellowship to study physical oceanography at Woods Hole Oceanographic Institution, and a National Science Foundation Graduate Fellowship at NCSU. He received his MS in Physics at NCSU in 1968.

Barr was named 1995 Distinguished Alumnus, North Carolina State University, College of Physical and Mathematical Sciences.

== Career and contributions ==
=== SAS software and SAS Institute ===
In 1966, Barr began working on the SAS System, a family of statistical analysis software used in data management, machine learning, and analytics. It is now used internationally in science, government, industry, and academia.

In September 1966, Barr presented the conceptual ideas of SAS to members of the Committee on Statistical Software of the University Statisticians of the Southern Experiment Stations (USSES) in Athens, Georgia.

Barr had earlier created an analysis-of-variance modeling language inspired by the notation of statistician Maurice Kendall. He developed it in assembly language on the IBM 1410, as a graduate student at North Carolina State University from 1962 to 1963. Dr. A. Grandage, author of IBM 650 analysis-of-variance programs, advised on some of the statistical computations. This was followed by a multiple regression program with a flexible input format and with algebraic transformation of variables, in 1963 to 1964. Drawing on those programs, along with his experience with structured data files, he created SAS, placing statistical procedures into a formatted file framework.

Barr's experience with structured data files was gained while working on the Formatted File System, (see below). From 1966 to 1968, Barr developed the fundamental structure and language of SAS. In 1968, Barr began collaborating with other programmers, most prominently James Goodnight, a student at North Carolina State University who became a co-leader of the project and developed procedures for general linear modelling for the system. Barr designed and implemented the programming language, data management, report writing, and systems areas of the evolving system.

SAS 71, the first official version of SAS, was released in 1971. John Sall joined the project in 1973 and developed various procedures, including procedures for econometrics, data management, and matrix manipulation. In 1976, Goodnight decided to begin developing and marketing SAS full time, and the SAS Institute, Inc. was incorporated by Barr, Goodnight, Sall, and Jane Helwig, with Barr holding the largest share (40%). He sold his shares in 1979.

=== Automated Classification of Medical Entities (ACME) ===
Barr created the ACME program for the National Center for Health Statistics from 1967 to 1969.

=== Automated Lumber Yield Optimization ===
Barr with A.G. Mullin computerized and sold a manufacturing system for cutting the most usable lumber from each board. According to the National Association of Furniture Manufacturers, this innovation saved millions for the industry.

=== Linking Loader for the IBM/360 ===
In 1968, Barr pioneered a Compile and go system for IBM OS/360 marketed by University Computing Company. The use of the Loader cut typical program testing times by 25 percent. IBM did not offer the equivalent Loader for over 18 months after the Barr Loader was commercially available.

=== IBM Workstation Simulators ===
In 1971, Barr created the first non-IBM HASP terminal emulator. Marketed by the University Computing Company (UCC), the HASP emulator gave a significant performance increase over the IBM 2780 emulator he had developed for UCC in 1969. The emulators were developed on the PDP-8 minicomputer and allowed COPE terminals to communicate with the IBM/360 and IBM/370.

In 1971, Barr also implemented the HASP workstation for M & M Computer Industries, Orange, California. Implemented on the Data General Nova minicomputer, the program became the Singer Corporation Remote Batch Terminal. Both Singer and UCC sold their terminal divisions to Harris Corporation, which continued to market the products.

In 1983, Barr developed hardware and software for performing HASP remote job entry communication on the IBM PC. His company, Barr Systems, Inc., marketed and sold Barr HASP, and went on to implement and support Bisync and SNA SDLC workstations and gateways, along with other data communications and output management products.

=== Formatted File System (FFS) ===
Barr was employed with IBM Federal Systems Division at the Pentagon, Washington, D.C. from 1964 to 1966. There he worked on the NIPS Formatted File System. FFS, a generalized data base management system for retrieval and report writing, was one of the first data management systems to take advantage of defined file structure for data storage and retrieval efficiency.

Assigned to work with the National Military Command Center, the information processing branch of the Joint Chiefs of Staff, Barr rewrote and enhanced FFS, implementing three of its five major components: retrieval, sorting, and file update. His work featured the innovation of a uniform lexical analyzer for all languages in the system with a uniform method of handling all error messages.

Working with FFS introduced Barr to the potential of the defined file structure, which was to become a central concept of SAS (above).

== Personal life ==
In 2021, Barr and his wife Olga donated $1 million to the Cade Museum for Creativity and Invention to support the museum's youth programming. The museum named the Tony & Olga Barr Gallery in their honor.

== Patents, publications, and education ==
=== Patents ===
- Barr, Tony, Satisfaction Metrics and Methods of Implementation, 8,380,560, 2-19-2013, Cl. 705-7.38.
- Barr, Anthony J. and Mullin, Alexander G., Apparatus and method for maximizing utilization of elongated stock. 4,017,976, 4-19-1977, Cl. 235-151.l.
- Barr, Anthony J. and Mullin, Alexander G., Apparatus for optimizing the yield of usable pieces from boards and the like. 3,942,021, 3-2-76, Cl. 250-572.000.
- Barr, Anthony J. and Mullin, Alexander G., Apparatus and method for optimizing the yield of usable pieces from boards and the like. 3,931,501, 1-6-76, Cl. 235-151.100.

=== Publications ===
- Manson, A. R.; Barr, A. J.; Goodnight, J. H. (1975), "Optimum Zero-Memory Strategy and Exact Probabilities for 4-Deck Blackjack", The American Statistician, 29 (2): 84–88, doi:10.1080/00031305.1975.10477376
- Barr, A. J.; Goodnight, J. H.; Sall, J. P.; Helwig, J. H. (1977), SAS Programmers' Guide, Raleigh, North Carolina: SAS Institute, Inc.
- Barr, A. J. (1977), "The Distribution and Maintenance of SAS", Computer Sciences and Statistics: Tenth Annual Symposium on the Interface, NBS Special Publication 503: 215–220
- Barr, A. J.; Goodnight, J. H.; Sall, J. P.; Helwig, J. T. (1976), A User's Guide to SAS 76, Raleigh, North Carolina: SAS Institute, Inc., ISBN 978-0-917382-01-7
- Barr, A. J. (1978), "Data Management in SAS and Interfaces to Other Systems", Proceedings of the Computer Science and Statistics: Eleventh Annual Symposium on the Interface, Institute of Statistics, North Carolina State University: 261–264

== See also ==
- Terminal emulator
- Linking loader
