= Prestonwood Country Club =

Private country club in Cary, North Carolina

- Location within the United States Location within North Carolina
- 35.7959°N 78.8357°W

Club information
- Location: Cary, North Carolina, U.S.
- Elevation: 340 feet (100 m)
- Established: 1988, 38 years ago
- Type: Private
- Tota holes: 54
- Tournaments: SAS Championship (2001–present)
- Greens: Bermuda (Meadows/Highlands); Bent grass (Fairways)
- Fairways: Bermuda
- Website: prestonwood.com

Meadows
- Designed by: Tom Jackson
- Par: 72
- Length: 7,015 yards (6,410 m)
- Course rating: 74.7
- Slope rating: 138

Highlands
- Designed by: Tom Jackson
- Par: 72
- Length: 7,018 yards (6,420 m)
- Course rating: 74.2
- Slope rating: 136

Fairways
- Designed by: Tom Jackson
- Par: 70
- Length: 6,291 yards (5,750 m)
- Course rating: 71.0
- Slope rating: 133

Prestonwood Country Club is a private country club in Cary, North Carolina, located near Research Triangle Park (RTP) and Raleigh-Durham International Airport (RDU). The country club's amenities include 54 holes of golf, 14 tennis courts, 4 pickleball courts, a full-service fitness and aquatics center, dining service and event space for various occasions. Prestonwood has played host to numerous national golf events including the SAS Championship and the Jimmy V Celebrity Golf Classic.

== History ==
Prestonwood Country Club opened on Memorial Day, 1988, offering a pool and fitness center. Later that summer, the club debuted 27 holes of golf. In 1991, the club was purchased by private investors, who then decided to expand Prestonwood by building more homes and roads. By early 1996, the club had expanded to 54 holes of golf, a driving range, three practice greens and a short game area. The country club rebuilt the pool and fitness center, which now consists of 8,000 ft^{2} (740 m^{2}) of space.

In 2003, the club also added new tennis courts at a satellite location. In 2005, Prestonwood built a 60,000 ft^{2} (5,600 m^{2}) addition to their clubhouse, including a grand ballroom and men's locker room. Other additions included a renovated golf pro shop, ladies locker room, and card room.

== Facilities ==
Golf: Prestonwood Country Club is the only private club in the area to boast 54 holes of championship golf. All three courses were designed by Tom Jackson but have been recently renovated green complexes by Jack Nicklaus protégé Rick Robbins.

- Fairways: Opened in January 1995 (renovations completed September 2010). The course yardage is 6,475 with a rating/slope of 71.0/133.
- Meadows: Opened in August 1988 (renovations completed September 2009). The course yardage is 7,015 with a rating/slope of 74.7/138.
- Highlands: Opened in January 1993 (renovations completed September 2011). The course yardage is 7,082 with a rating/slope 74.2/136.

In addition, it has a driving range, three practice greens, a short game area, and state of the art learning and club fitting center. The club utilizes a full-service golf pro shop with five PGA Golf Class A professionals and three assistant professionals.

== Events ==
SAS Championship: The SAS Championship is a Champions Tour event that has been hosted by Prestonwood since 2001. The course plays at 7,237 yards and is a mix of the Highlands and Meadows courses. The 2024 SAS Championship champion was Jerry Kelly.

Jimmy V Celebrity Golf Classic: The tournament, named after the late Jim Valvano, was started to support cancer research. It was played at Prestonwood for 20 years starting in 1994, and was last played in 2013. While at Prestonwood the tournament raised over $13.5 million and drew in such celebrities as Michael Jordan, Bob Costas, and Kevin Costner.
