= World Programming System =

Data analysis software

World Programming System (WPS)
- WPS Workbench running on Windows 10
- Developer: World Programming
- Release: 2002; 24 years ago
- Stable release: v4.4 / March, 2022
- Operating system: Windows, macOS, z/OS, Linux (x86, Armv8 64-bit, IBM Power LE, IBM Z), AIX
- Type: Statistics
- License: Proprietary
- Website: www.worldprogramming.com

The World Programming System, also known as WPS Analytics or WPS, is a software product developed by a company called World Programming (acquired by Altair Engineering).

WPS Analytics supports users of mixed ability to access and process data and to perform data science tasks. It has interactive visual programming tools using data workflows, and it has coding tools supporting the use of the SAS language mixed with Python, R and SQL.

== About ==
WPS can use programs written in the language of SAS without the need for translating them into any other language. In this regard WPS is compatible with the SAS system. WPS has a built-in language interpreter able to process the language of SAS and produce similar results.

WPS is available to run on z/OS, Windows, macOS, Linux (x86, Armv8 64-bit, IBM Power LE, IBM Z), and AIX.

On all supported platforms, programs written in the language of SAS can be executed from a WPS command line interface, often referred to as running in batch mode.

WPS can also be used from a graphical user interface known as the WPS Workbench for managing, editing and running programs written in the language of SAS. The WPS Workbench user interface is based on Eclipse.

WPS version 4 (released in March 2018) introduced a drag-and-drop workflow canvas providing interactive blocks for data retrieval, blending and preparation, data discovery and profiling, predictive modelling powered by machine learning algorithms, model performance validation and scorecards.

WPS version 3 (released in February 2012) provided a new client/server architecture that allows the WPS Workbench GUI to execute SAS programs on remote server installations of WPS in a network or cloud. The resulting output, data sets, logs, etc., can then all be viewed and manipulated from inside the Workbench as if the workloads had been executed locally. SAS programs do not require any special language statements to use this feature.

== Summary of main features ==
- Runs on Windows, macOS, z/OS, Linux (x86, Armv8 64-bit, IBM Power LE, IBM Z), and AIX
- An integrated development environment based on Eclipse for Linux, macOS and Windows.
- Support for language of SAS elements.
- Support for the language of SAS Macros.
- Matrix Programming support using PROC IML.
- Support for generating band plots, bar charts, box plots, bubble plots, contour plots, dendrogram plots, ellipse plots, fringe plots, heat maps, high-low plots, histograms, loess plots, needle plots, pie charts, penalised b-spline, radar charts, reference lines, scatter plots, series plots, step plots, regression plots and vector plots.
- Support for statistical procedures ACECLUS, ASSOCRULES, ANOVA, BIN, BOXPLOT, CANCORR, CANDISC, CLUSTER, CORRESP, DISCRIM, DISTANCE, FACTOR, FASTCLUS, FREQ, GAM, GANNO, GENMOD, GLIMMIX, GLM, GLMMOD, GLMSELECT, ICLIFETEST, KDE, LIFEREG, LIFETEST, LOESS, LOGISTIC, MDS, MEANS, MI, MIANALYSE, MIXED, MODECLUS, NESTED, NLIN, NPAR1WAY, PHREG, PLAN, PLS, POWER, PRINCOMP, PROBIT, QUANTREG, RBF, REG, ROBUSTREG, RSREG, SCORE, SEGMENT, SIMNORMAL, STANDARD, STDSIZE, STDRATE, STEPDISC, SUMMARY, SURVEYMEANS, SURVEYSELECT, TPSPLINE, TRANSREG, TREE, TTEST, UNIVARIATE, VARCLUS, VARCOMP
- Support for time series procedures ARIMA, AUTOREG, ESM, EXPAND, FORECAST, LOAN, SEVERITY, SPECTRA, TIMESERIES, X12
- Support for machine learning procedures DECISIONFOREST, DECISIONTREE, GMM, MLP, OPTIMALBIN, SEGMENT, SVM
- Support for ODS.
- Reads and writes SAS datasets (compressed or uncompressed).
- Access: Actian Matrix (previously known as ParAccel), DASD, DB2, Excel, Greenplum, Hadoop, Informix, Kognitio, MariaDB, MySQL, Netezza, ODBC, OLEDB, Oracle, PostgreSQL, SAND, Snowflake, SPSS/PSPP, SQL Server, Sybase, Sybase IQ, Teradata, VSAM, Vertica and XML.
- Support for SAS Tape Format.
- Direct output of reports to CSV, PDF and HTML.
- Support to connect WPS systems programmatically, remote submit parts of a program to execute on connected remote servers, upload and download data between the connected systems.
- Support for Hadoop
- Support for R
- Support for Python

== Industry recognition ==
Gartner recognized World Programming in their Cool Vendors in Data Science, 2014 Report.

== Lawsuit ==
In 2010 World Programming defended its use of the language of SAS in the High Court of England and Wales in SAS Institute Inc. v World Programming Ltd.

The software was the subject of a lawsuit by SAS Institute. The EU Court of Justice ruled in favor of World Programming, stating that the copyright protection does not extend to the software functionality, the programming language used and the format of the data files used by the program. It stated that there is no copyright infringement when a company which does not have access to the source code of a program studies, observes and tests that program to create another program with the same functionality.
