= University Statisticians of the Southern Experiment Stations =

The University Statisticians of the Southern Experiment Stations (USSES) was a coalition of southern Universities formed in the mid-1960s for the purpose of coordinating efforts in the development of statistical software. This coalition was largely motivated by introduction of the IBM System/360, which required the reprogramming of all software developed on previous IBM models.

North Carolina State University played a leading role within the coalition because they had a larger programming staff and were well funded through a grant from the National Institute of Health.

== See also ==
- Anthony James Barr
- Gertrude Mary Cox
- James Goodnight
- SAS System
