= World Programming =

- Company type: Private Limited Company
- Industry: Software
- Founded: 2000
- Headquarters: UK
- Products: WPS
- Website: www.worldprogramming.com

World Programming is a private limited company headquartered in the UK.

They tend to develop and distribute software products concerned with numerical analysis, business intelligence and data distribution.

The company's main software products is the World Programming System (WPS or WPS Analytics). The software was the subject of a lawsuit by SAS Institute. The EU Court of Justice ruled in favor of World Programming, stating that the copyright protection does not extend to the software functionality, the programming language used, and the format of the data files used by the program. It stated that there is no copyright infringement, when a company which does not have access to the source code of a program studies, observes and tests that program to create another program with the same functionality.

In December 2021, Altair Engineering announced that it would acquire World Programming on 15 December 2021.
