= Tarheel Forensic League =

- Company type: Non Profit Organization
- Founded: 1976
- Headquarters: North Carolina
- Key people: Keith Pittman, Asheville (Chair); Crawford Leavoy, Durham Academy (Vice Chair); Mike Bischoff, North Mecklenburg (Secretary); Bilal Butt, Charlotte Latin (Member); Michelle Boswell, Cumberland Polytechnic (Member); Ben Denton, Pinecrest (Member); Shannon Jarman, Cumberland International (Member); RJ Pellicciotta, Cary Academy (Member); Carmen Kohn, Charlotte Catholic (Member)
- Website: www.ncspeechanddebate.org

The Tarheel Forensic League is the speech and debate league for North Carolina. It was created in 1976 and is made up of 44 schools. League members compete in the debate events of Lincoln-Douglas debate, Public Forum debate, and Congressional debate. Speech events include Extemporaneous Speaking, Humorous Interpretation, Duo Interpretation, Dramatic Interpretation, Impromptu Speaking, Original Oratory, and Radio Announcing.
