= John Sall =

American businessman and software developer

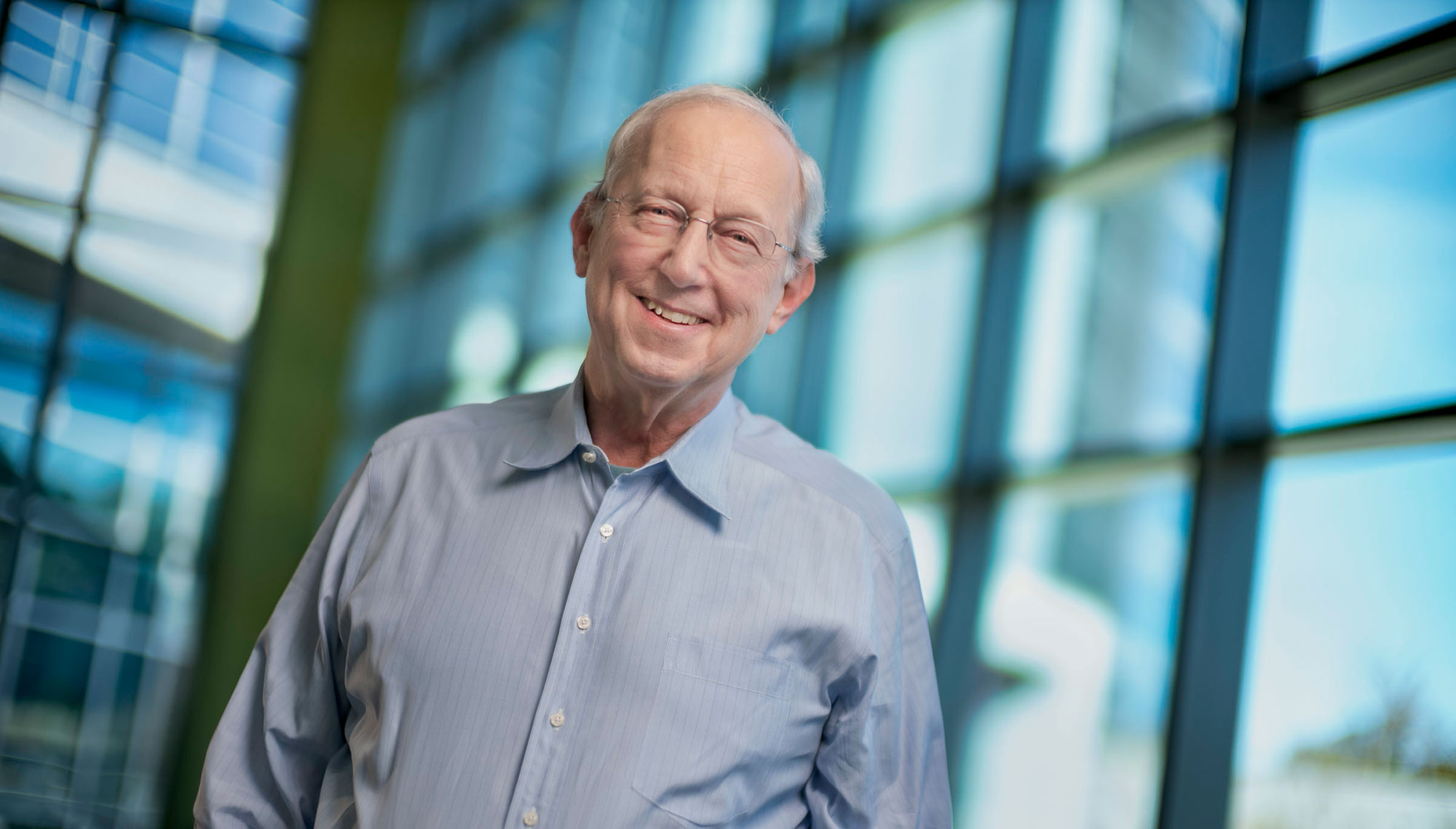
- Born: 1948 (age 76–77); Rockford, Illinois, US
- Occupation(s): Co-founder and executive vice president, SAS Institute
- Spouse: Ginger Sall
- Children: 4

John P. Sall (born 1948) is an American billionaire businessman and computer software developer, who co-founded SAS Institute, an analytics software company, and created the JMP statistical software.

== Early life ==
John Sall was born in Rockford, Illinois in 1948. As a child, he developed an interest in science.

He received a bachelor's degree in history from Beloit College in Beloit, Wisconsin. Sall felt he graduated into a weak job market, so he went to graduate school at Northern Illinois University, where he earned a master's degree in economics. It was at graduate school that Sall became interested in statistics and computer science. He went on to study graduate-level statistics at North Carolina State University, where he received an honorary doctorate in 2003. He received an honorary doctorate from NIU in 2014.

== Career ==
Sall collaborated with James Goodnight at North Carolina State University. In 1976, the two co-founded SAS Institute, an analytics software company, with fellow NCSU alumni Anthony James Barr and Jane Helwig.

The company is best known for developing the SAS suite of analytics and data management software. Sall designed, developed, and documented many of the earliest procedures of the SAS language. Some of his contributions included procedures for working with time series, econometrics, categorical data and matrix algebraic manipulations. SAS software was originally developed to analyze agricultural data, but its modern applications include machine learning, natural language processing, deep learning, and computer vision.

SAS Institute grew rapidly, becoming one of the largest privately held software providers in the world and earning $3.2 billion in annual revenue as of 2022. In 2021, it was announced that the company was preparing for an initial public offering (IPO). During this time, the company has invested heavily into the research and development of artificial intelligence tools designed for industries like finance, healthcare, and insurance.

=== JMP ===
Sall started developing JMP, which originally stood for "John's Macintosh Project", in the 1980s, when the graphical user interface was introduced on the Macintosh. JMP is distributed by JMP Statistical Discovery, LLC, a wholly owned subsidiary of SAS. Sall and a small team of developers spent a year and a half working on JMP before version one was released in October 1989. Sall continued to do coding and product development for JMP software for more than 20 years, supporting Windows 3.1, writing the product in different implementation languages, re-writing the product's "nervous system" and improving the JMP scripting language. Today Sall still acts as JMP's chief architect.

He also co-authored the book JMP Start Statistics with Ann Lehman and Lee Creighton.

== Personal life ==
Sall lives in Cary, North Carolina. He is married to Ginger Sall, with whom he has four children.

Sall was elected Fellow of the American Statistical Association in 1998 and Fellow of the American Association for the Advancement of Science in 2015, he is also a member of the North Carolina State University board of trustees. In 1994, he served as chairman of the Interface Foundation of North America. He received the Distinguished Alumnus Award from North Carolina State University's College of Sciences in 2017.

=== Philanthropy and wealth ===
Sall owns about one-third of SAS Institute, while Goodnight owns the remainder. According to Forbes, Sall's net worth was approximately $4.2 billion as of 2016, making him the 392nd richest person in the United States at the time. As of 2009, most of Sall's net worth was illiquid, and based on the estimated worth of his partial ownership in SAS Institute. In 2018, Sall was still working, doing programming, and leading a team of developers.

Sall and his wife are involved in conservation, international health and development, and environmental issues through the Sall Family Foundation. Sall was on the board of The Nature Conservancy from 2002 to 2011, and is a member of the board for the Smithsonian National Museum of Natural History. Sall and his wife also work with the World Wide Fund for Nature (WWF), CARE, Pan American Health Organization, and other non-profits. They contributed to the founding of Cary Academy, an independent college preparatory school for students grades six through 12.
