= Formatted File System =

Military database management system

The Formatted File System (FFS) is the name of a series of Database Management Systems (DBMS) developed for military use and designed to run on IBM mainframe computers.

The period from 1964 to 1968 saw the transition from isolated DBMS development efforts to the development of DBMS families. The Formatted File System is one such family. Others included General Electric's IDS family, and the Mark IV series developed by Informatics Inc. (later acquired by Sterling Software). These families were developed across organizations and branches of government, spreading and evolving with their primary developers. Beginning around 1968, industry DBMS development became increasingly proprietary.

== Family Members ==
- IRS(DTMB), 1958, IBM 704
  - Information Retrieval System (David Taylor Model Basin)
- TUFF/TUG(DTMB), 1959, IBM 704/9
  - Tape Update for Formatted Files / Tape Updater and Generator (David Taylor Model Basin)
- FFS(SAC), 1961, IBM 7090
  - Formatted File System (Strategic Air Command)
- FFS(IDHS), 1963, IBM 1401
  - Formatted File System (Intelligence Data-Handling System)
- FFS(FICEUR), 1963, IBM 1410
  - Formatted File System (Naval Fleet Intelligence Center in Europe)
- FFS(DIA-IDHS), 1965, IBM 1410
  - Formatted File System (Defense Intelligence Agency - Intelligence Data-Handling System)
- GIS, 1965, IBM SYSTEM/360
  - Generalized Information System
- NIPS, 1965, IBM 1410
  - NMCS (National Military Command System) Information Processing System
- NIPS, 1968, IBM SYSTEM/360
  - NMCS (National Military Command System) Information Processing System
- CDMS, 1968, IBM SYSTEM/360
  - Cobol Data Management System
