= SAS Viya =

Analytics software suite

- Developer: SAS Institute
- Release: 2016; 10 years ago
- Type: Artificial intelligence; Data analytics; Data management

SAS Viya is an artificial intelligence, analytics and data management platform developed by SAS Institute, that combines data management, machine learning, analytics, model deployment and decisioning capabilities.

== History ==
SAS Viya was released in 2016. The software was containerized with the release of Viya 4 in 2020. Viya has become one of SAS' most widely used platforms during the AI boom, as artificial intelligence becomes more widely used in business and computing.

== Technical overview ==
The platform is cloud-native, and is executed on SAS's Cloud Analytics Services (CAS) engine. It is compatible with open source software, allowing users to build models using open sources tool such as R, Python and Jupyter. It integrates with major large language models like GPT-4 and Gemini Pro. The platform uses econometrics to create predictive models for forecasting scenarios based on complex data. It also has features for detecting algorithmic bias, auditing decisions and monitoring models. It is implemented through a low-code, no-code platform.

The software is available on Amazon AWS Marketplace, Google Cloud, Red Hat OpenShift, and on Microsoft Azure Marketplace under a pay-as-you-use model.

== Software ==
SAS Viya has released software as a service (SaaS) modules for creating AI content. These include Viya Workbench, Viya App Factory, Viya Copilot, and SAS Data Maker. The company also develops industry specific models, used by companies including Georgia-Pacific.

The development of SAS Viya is guided by the SAS Data Ethics Practice team, which was established in 2021 to build in responsible innovation capabilities that address potential ethical issues of artificial intelligence and comply with regulatory guidelines governing AI. The software includes features based around intelligent forecasting, bias detection, explainability, decision auditability, model monitoring and governance to provide increased transparency, accountability, and accuracy.

=== Modules ===
SAS Data Maker is a synthetic data generator that creates realistic datasets used to train large language models. SAS Viya Copilot is a generative AI virtual assistant used in business, software development, and data science. It includes tools for knowledge gap analysis, data management and code generation. SAS Viya Workbench is a computing environment for developing analytical and machine learning AI models. Users can develop models in SAS Viya Workbench using either a Visual Studio Code interface or Jupyter, and can integrate custom Python libraries and customizable CPU/GPU requirements.

== Applications ==
=== Banking ===
The software is also widely used in business, especially in areas such as predictive modelling and fraud detection.

=== Insurance ===
SAS Viya is used in insurance for tasks such as actuarial analytics and modelling, as well as regulatory reporting.

=== Healthcare and life sciences ===
In 2023, the company introduced SAS Health, a common health data model built on the SAS Viya platform. AstraZeneca has partnered with SAS to use SAS Viya and SAS Life Science Analytics Framework in its delivery and approval processes. In 2024, SAS partnered with the University of Cambridge's Maxwell Center to use SAS Viya for healthcare research and development.

=== Public sector ===
SAS Viya is used in partnership with national and local governments to provide services and detect tax fraud.

=== Education ===
SAS Viya is used in research and education, particularly studies related to business intelligence, cybersecurity and data management. SAS Institute has partnered with educational institutions such as Appalachian State University, Clemson University, University of Arkansas, Stockholm University, and Marian University, to provide access to and training for using SAS Viya.

== See also ==
- SAS (software)
