= Ivey-Ellington House =

Historic house in North Carolina, United States

- U.S. National Register of Historic Places
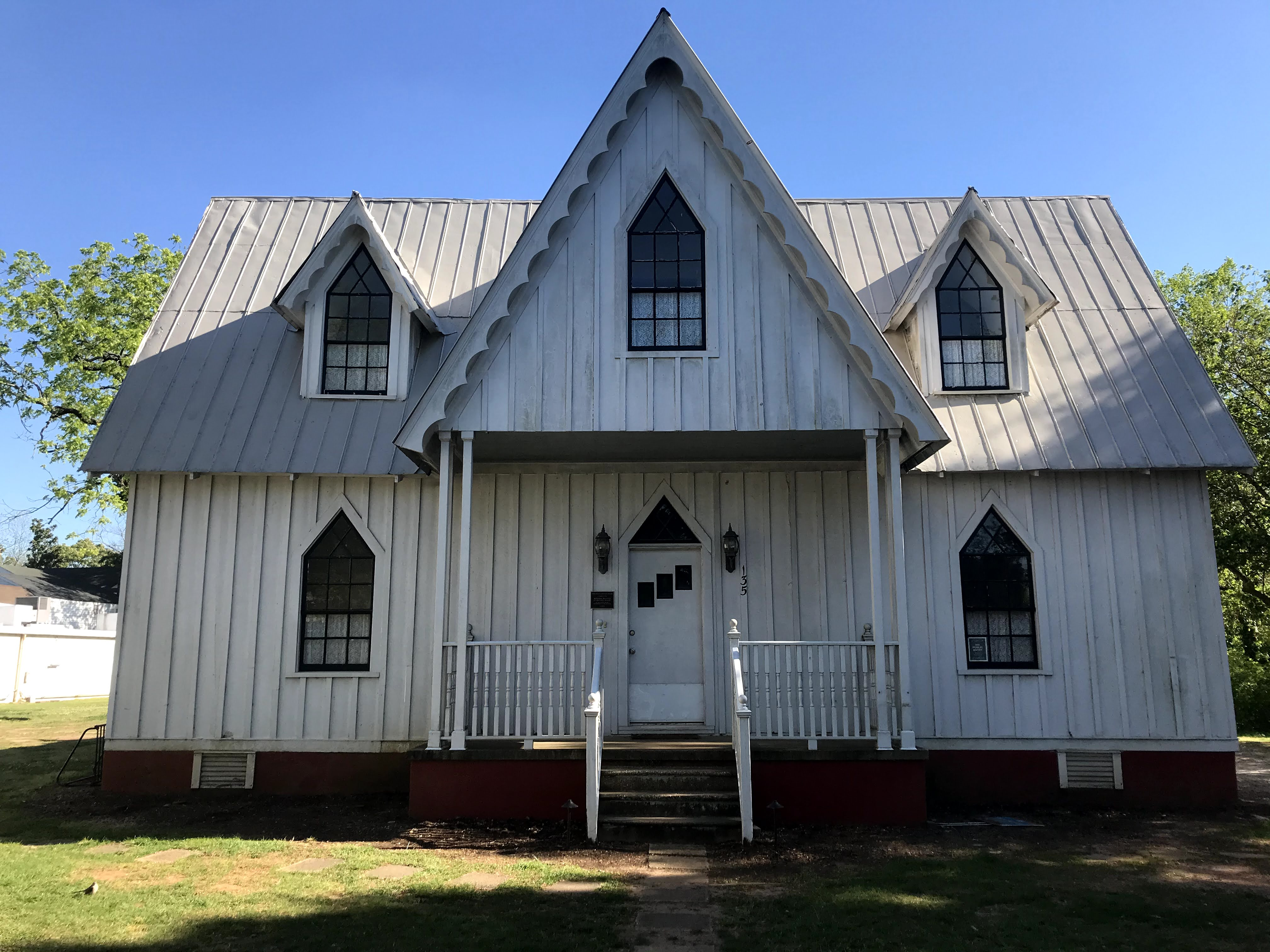

- Location within North Carolina Location within the United States
- Location: 308 S. Academy St., Cary, North Carolina
- Coordinates: 35°47′20″N 78°46′56″W
- Area: 0.8 acres (0.32 ha)
- Built: c. 1870
- Architectural style: Gothic Revival
- MPS: Wake County MPS
- NRHP reference No.: 08000414
- Added to NRHP: May 15, 2008

Ivey-Ellington House is a historic home located at Cary, Wake County, North Carolina. The house was built about 1870 in the gothic cottage stye. It is a 1 1/2-story, "T"-plan, frame I-house with board-and-batten siding. It has a steeply pitched roof, decorative scalloped gable trim, and pointed-arch windows.

It was listed on the National Register of Historic Places in 2008. The Town of Cary purchased the house in November 2011. The town entered a development agreement in 2019 that required the relocation of the building. The house was relocated from 135 W. Chatham St to 308 S. Academy St. on February 20, 2023, on the site of the former Cary Community Library. Rehabilitation of the house following the move was completed in the spring of 2025 and the house opened for tours on August 6, 2025. The town forwent the National Register designation after relocation to avoid any scrutiny for moving it into the existing Cary Historic District.
