= Carpenter, North Carolina =

Unincorporated community in North Carolina, US

Coordinates: 35°49′16″N 78°52′19″W

Carpenter is a small unincorporated community located in western Wake County, North Carolina, United States. Carpenter is centered on the intersection of Carpenter-Upchurch Road and Morrisville-Carpenter Road just east of North Carolina Highway 55. Most of Carpenter has been annexed by the Town of Cary. The community was named for William Carpenter, the first settler in the area, in 1865 (Powell 1968, p. 89). Carpenter was a stop on the former Durham and Southern Railway. Part of the community also includes the Carpenter Historic District, which was created in 2000.

Carpenter Elementary was named for the community but lies in a recently annexed part of Cary.
