= Green Level, Wake County, North Carolina =

Historic district in North Carolina, US

- Green Level Historic District
- U.S. National Register of Historic Places
- U.S. Historic district
- Location within North Carolina Location within the United States
- Location: Jct. Green Level Church, Green Level West Rd., and Beaver Dam Rd., Cary, North Carolina
- Coordinates: 35°47′06″N 78°54′11″W
- Area: 75 acres (30 ha)
- Built: 1907
- Architectural style: Gothic Revival, Colonial Revival, et al.
- MPS: Wake County MPS
- NRHP reference No.: 01000340
- Added to NRHP: April 5, 2001

Green Level is an unincorporated community in southwestern Wake County, North Carolina, United States. It was founded c. 1800 and is one of the best preserved crossroads communities in the county. Although historically connected to the town of Apex, Green Level now lies within the municipal jurisdiction of the town of Cary.

== History ==
The community started as a crossroads along the stage route between Raleigh and Pittsboro in the first half of the 19th century. It formed where the stage route crossed the Holly Springs to Hillsborough Road. The community was literally named because it was "green" and "level". Green Level was a resting spot for the stagecoach and also became a social and commercial hub for people who lived several miles out in the surrounding countryside. Families living in the area included Council, Ferrell, Mills, Upchurch, Utley, and Yates.

A post office was established in Green Level in 1847. Its postmasters included Thomas S. Johnson, Sidney W. Mitchell, Golden H. Upchurch, James H. Upchurch, and Thomas J. Utley. Its post office closed in 1888.

Green Level started growing after the Civil War and included a Baptist church, two grist and sawmills, a Masonic Lodge (founded in 1867), two schools, and seven stores by the early 1870s. The church was founded in 1870 by Rev. Matthew Ferrell and was originally known as the Providence Baptist Church but was later renamed Green Level Baptist Church in 1871.

Green Level continued to function as a commercial center through the early 20th century, important to the local bright-leaf tobacco farmers. This tobacco was a lucrative cash crop that grew especially well in Western Wake County because of its rich Triassic soils. However, with the arrival of the railroad and the automobile, the stage route and local community center was no longer as significant. Although Green Level began declining in the mid-20th century, its church and Masonic Lodge continued to be active. In the later part of the 20th century, the community became part of in an area of Wake County that was suburbanizing with commuters.

== Green Level Historic District ==
The core of the community was designated the Green Level Historic District in 2001. This national historic district encompasses some 75 acres (30 ha)that includes 31 contributing buildings, one contributing site and four contributing structures in the crossroads community of Green Level. It also includes a cemetery. Its boundaries are the intersection of Green Level Church Road and Green Level West Road, and Green Level Church Road north for approximately 3,000 feet (910 m).

The district developed sometime during the period between roughly 1890 and 1945 and includes notable examples of Colonial Revival and Gothic Revival, style architecture. One of the central buildings of the community is Green Level Baptist Church (1907), located near the crossroads of Green Level Church Road and Green Level West Road. It features Gothic Revival details and is one of the best-preserved country churches in Wake County.

Other notable buildings include the Green Level Community Store (1945), A. C. and Helon Council House (late 19th century), the Vick and Mattie Council House. (c. 1890), and the Alious H. and Daisey Mills Farm and Store (1916). The historic district also includes the. M. and Vallaria Council Farm, a well-preserved tobacco farm complex. Its National Register application form notes, "The district as a whole remains remarkably intact, retaining integrity of setting, location, design, materials, feeling, and association."
