= Sri Venkateswara Temple of North Carolina =

Hindu temple in Cary, North Carolina, US

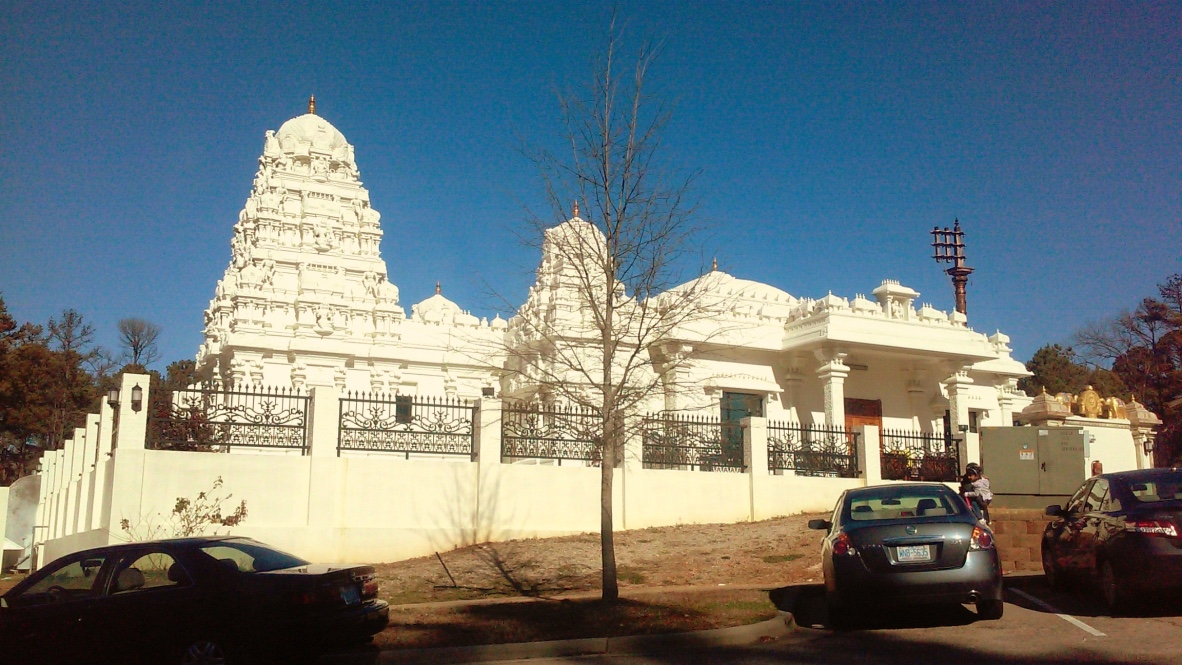
- Sri Venkateswara Temple

- Location in North Carolina

Religion
- Affiliation: Hinduism

Location
- Location: 21 Balaji Place, Cary
- State: North Carolina
- Country: United States
- Coordinates: 35.801388°N 78.805369°W

Architecture
- Type: Dravidian architecture
- Creator: Nand Gopal Sachdeva
- Completed: 2009

Website
- www.svtemplenc.org

Sri Venkateswara Temple of North Carolina is a Hindu Temple located in Cary, North Carolina and serves the estimated 21,000 Hindus in the Research Triangle area. The temple is "dedicated to promoting the Hindu religion and humanitarian services across the Triangle."

== History ==
Starting in 1988, there was a growing demand by South Indians, living in the Research Triangle Park, for an alternative South Indian-style temple. The only Hindu Temple in the area was an eclectic Hindu Temple in Morrisville. In July 1998, a couple bought 2.8 acres (1.1 ha) of undeveloped land at 21 Balaji Place, Cary. In January 1999, a Bhoomi Puja was held to purify the land and allow construction to begin. In 2002, Cary approved zoning for the construction of a Hindu temple. However, the group had to raise the funds for its construction.

=== Construction ===
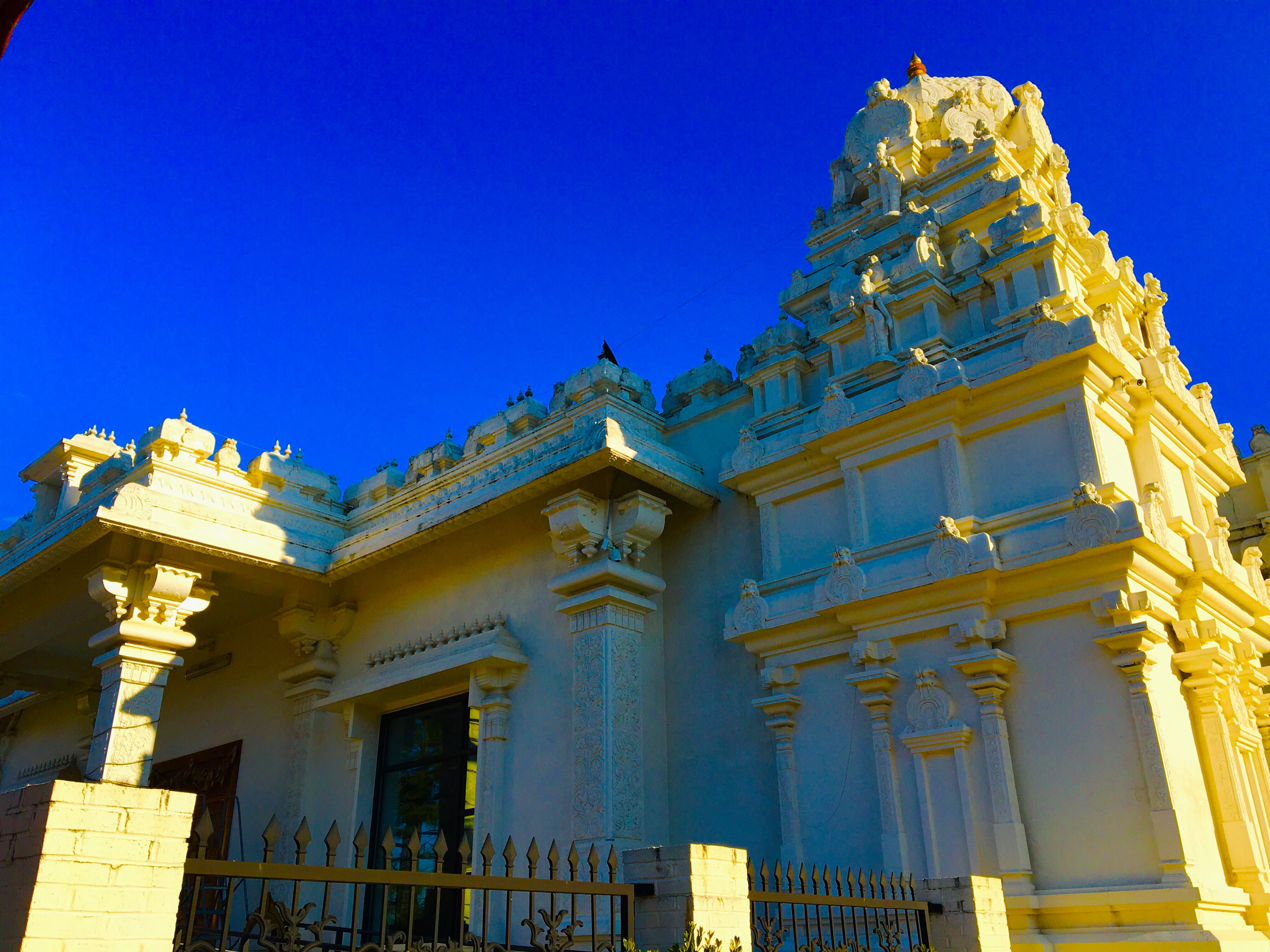
Detail of Sri Venkateswara Temple of North Carolina

By 2007, the plans and design for the Sri Venkateswara Temple were finalized. The construction of the temple began in 2007. Fourteen artisans were brought in from India to hand carve the temple's decorative Hindu idols out of cement. Engineer Nand Gopal Sachdeva was the main builder; he worked free of charge and billed other expenses at cost. Without his generosity, the temple would have cost $6 million, but ended up only costing $3.5 million. The construction of the temple was completed in May 2009. In October 2022, the entrance tower or Rajagopuram was inaugurated by North Carolina Governor Roy Cooper. It was built by artisans from India and is 87 ft (27 m) tall, and is the tallest one in North America. The tower is also called the Tower of Unity and Prosperity.

=== Consecration ===
On May 29, 2009, Prana Pratishtha, a ceremony dedicated to inviting a deity to live in the temple, was held and the temple was open the following day. The temple was dedicated to Venkateswara, the god of wealth and well-being.

The opening ceremony of the Sri Venkateswara Temple was attended by over 10,000 guests including several politicians. During the ceremony, a 9 feet (2.7 m), 4,000 pounds (1,800 kg) statue of Sri Venkateswara, a form of Vishnu, was installed along with eighteen other deities. The total cost of the opening ceremony and consecration was over $1 million.

== Growth ==
Governor Roy Cooper signed a Diwali Proclamation, for the first time in the history of North Carolina, at Sri Venkateswara Temple North Carolina October 18, 2017. The next day, for Diwali, there was a celebration at the governor's mansion in Raleigh, which ended with ending Chakrapani Kumara, the SV Temples priest, offering prayers.

Originally at 2.8 acres (1.1 ha), the Temple's campus has expanded to 9 acres (3.6 ha).

== Design ==
The Temple is modeled after the famous Sri Venkateswara Temple in Tirupathi in the state of Andhra Pradesh, India. Bhaskar Venepalli, a member of the SV Temple board of trustees, says “That temple is mighty and as powerful as the Vatican. People stand in lines for several hours to go into the temple. In that context, it is very unique.” The temple's main area includes a wide Gopuram, which was revealed on the day of Diwali in 2022.

=== Deities ===
The primary deity of the temple is Venkateswara, a form of Vishnu, and also includes other murtis, or devotional images, of commonly worshipped deities in South India. The temple includes a Shiva Aalayam, where there are deities of Shiva, Parvati, Ganesha, Ayyappa, and Subrahmanya. In the outside area of the Vishnu Temple, the temple's deities include Hanuman, Narasimha, Sudarshana, and Vishvaksena. The Vishnu temple includes deities Venkateswara, Padmavathi, and Goda Devi. The temple's floors are black granite.

== Other structures ==
The property purchased for the Temple included the Nancy Jones House, the oldest building in Cary. In 2019, the Town of Cary bought the Nancy Jones House, from Sri Venkateswara Temple, NC for $100,000 with plans of moving it off of Temple Grounds. Cary purchased the structure for its historical preservation.
