= Wine Collector 200 =

Wine Collector 300 is a wine collection and management package from IntelliScanner Corporation. Wine Collector was released in December 2004. Wine Collector uses the UPC barcode found on wine bottles to look up information on wines from an Internet-enabled database containing approximately 67,000 wine records, according to the company. Data can also be imported into the application from tab-delimited text files. Wine label art work and tasting notes can be added for wines in the database. Inventory lists can be exported and printed.

== Specifications ==
Wine Collector is sold as a bundle of software and hardware with a portable IntelliScanner mini barcode reader. The same wine software is also included as part of the IntelliScanner Corporation's IntelliScanner mini bundle which also includes other software for organizing media, groceries, and other home assets. Wine Collector is available for both Mac OS X and Microsoft Windows.
