= IntelliScanner =

American hardware and software company

IntelliScanner Corporation
- Type: Corporation
- Industry: Software publishing
- Founded: Cary, North Carolina
- Headquarters: Cary, North Carolina
- Key people: Paul Scandariato
- Products: IntelliScanner mini, IntelliScanner SOHO, Wine Collector 300, Media Collector, Comic Edition, IntelliScanner Pro, Daneizo Lending Management System, IntelliScanner Asset Tags
- Website: www.intelliscanner.com

IntelliScanner Corporation is a North Carolina–based hardware and software company that specializes in barcode enabled organizational products for home and business use. IntelliScanner is known for their use of barcode technology and Internet-enabled software to automatically enter information on media items, wine and groceries, as well as utilizing barcodes to allow users to organize other types of items with or without a barcode.

IntelliScanner is perhaps best known for its bundling of software and hardware – a practice that has been met with praise for all-in-one convenience and criticism from customers who already own a scanner and would prefer to only buy software. IntelliScanner's software and hardware products run on Mac OS X and Microsoft Windows operating systems. IntelliScanner is a subsidiary of Apparent Corporation.

== Product list ==
- IntelliScanner mini: media, wine, grocery, and home asset organization.
- IntelliScanner SOHO: small business organization scanner with inventory software.
- Wine Collector 200: wine collection management.
- Daneizo Lending Management System: software and scanner package for book and library management.
- IntelliScanner Pro: business and educational-class tethered USB barcode reader.
- IntelliScanner Asset Tags: self-adhesive barcode tags.
