= Cary, North Carolina =

Town in North Carolina, US

Cary
- Town
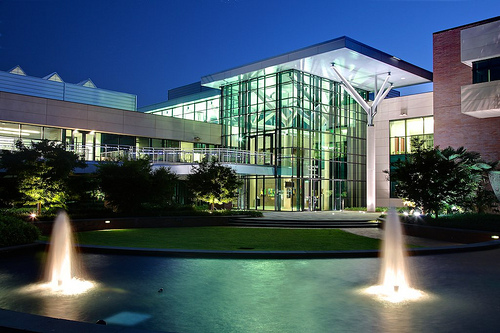
- Cary Town Hall

- Flag Seal Logo
- Motto: "Live Inspired"
- Interactive map of Cary
- Location in the United States
- Coordinates: 35°46′55″N 78°49′12″W
- Country: United States
- State: North Carolina
- Counties: Chatham; Wake; Durham
- Founded: 1750
- Incorporated: April 3, 1871
- Named for: Samuel Fenton Cary

Government
  - Type: Council-manager government
  - Town Manager: Russ Overton
  - Town Clerk: Virginia Johnson
  - Town Attorney: Lisa Glover

Area
  - Total: 61.05 sq mi (158.12 km^{2})
  - Land: 59.94 sq mi (155.24 km^{2})
  - Water: 1.11 sq mi (2.88 km^{2}) 1.82%
- Elevation: 410 ft (120 m)

Population (2020)
  - Total: 174,721
  - Estimate (2023): 180,010
  - Rank: 146th in the United States; 7th in North Carolina
  - Density: 2,915.0/sq mi (1,125.49/km^{2})
- Demonym: Caryite
- Time zone: UTC-5 (EST)
  - Summer (DST): UTC-4 (EDT)
- ZIP Codes: 27511–27513, 27518, 27519
- Area code: 919, 984
- FIPS code: 37-10740
- GNIS ID: 2406229
- Website: www.carync.gov

Cary is a town in Wake, Chatham, and Durham counties in the U.S. state of North Carolina and is part of the Raleigh-Cary, NC Metropolitan Statistical Area. According to the 2020 census, its population was 174,721, making it the seventh-most populous municipality in North Carolina, and the 146th-most populous in the United States. In 2023, the town's population had increased to 180,010.

Cary began as a railroad village and became known as an educational center in the late 19th and early 20th centuries. In April 1907, Cary High School became the first state-funded public high school in North Carolina. The creation of the nearby Research Triangle Park in 1959 resulted in Cary's population doubling in a few years, tripling in the 1970s, and doubling in both the 1980s and 1990s. Cary is now the location of technology companies, including SAS Institute, the world's largest privately held software company.

In Cary, 68.4% of adults hold a bachelor's degree or higher, which is higher than the state average. In 2021, it was identified as the safest mid-sized place to live in the United States, based on 2019 FBI data. It also has a median household income of $113,782, higher than the county average of $88,471 or the state average of $60,516.

== History ==
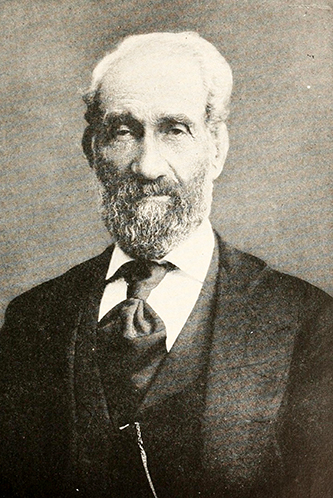
Allison Francis Page, first mayor and founder of Cary

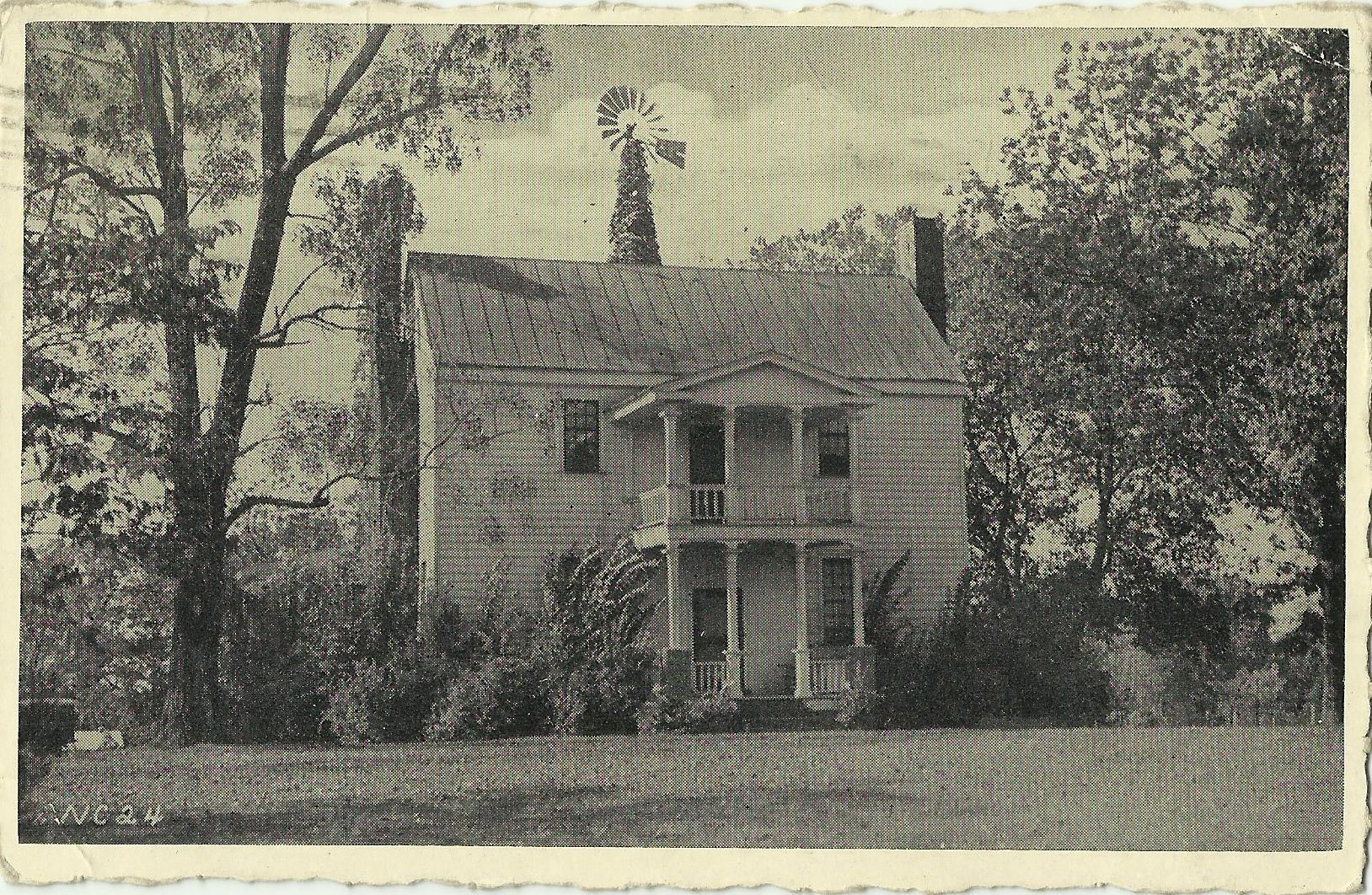
Nancy Jones House in 1939

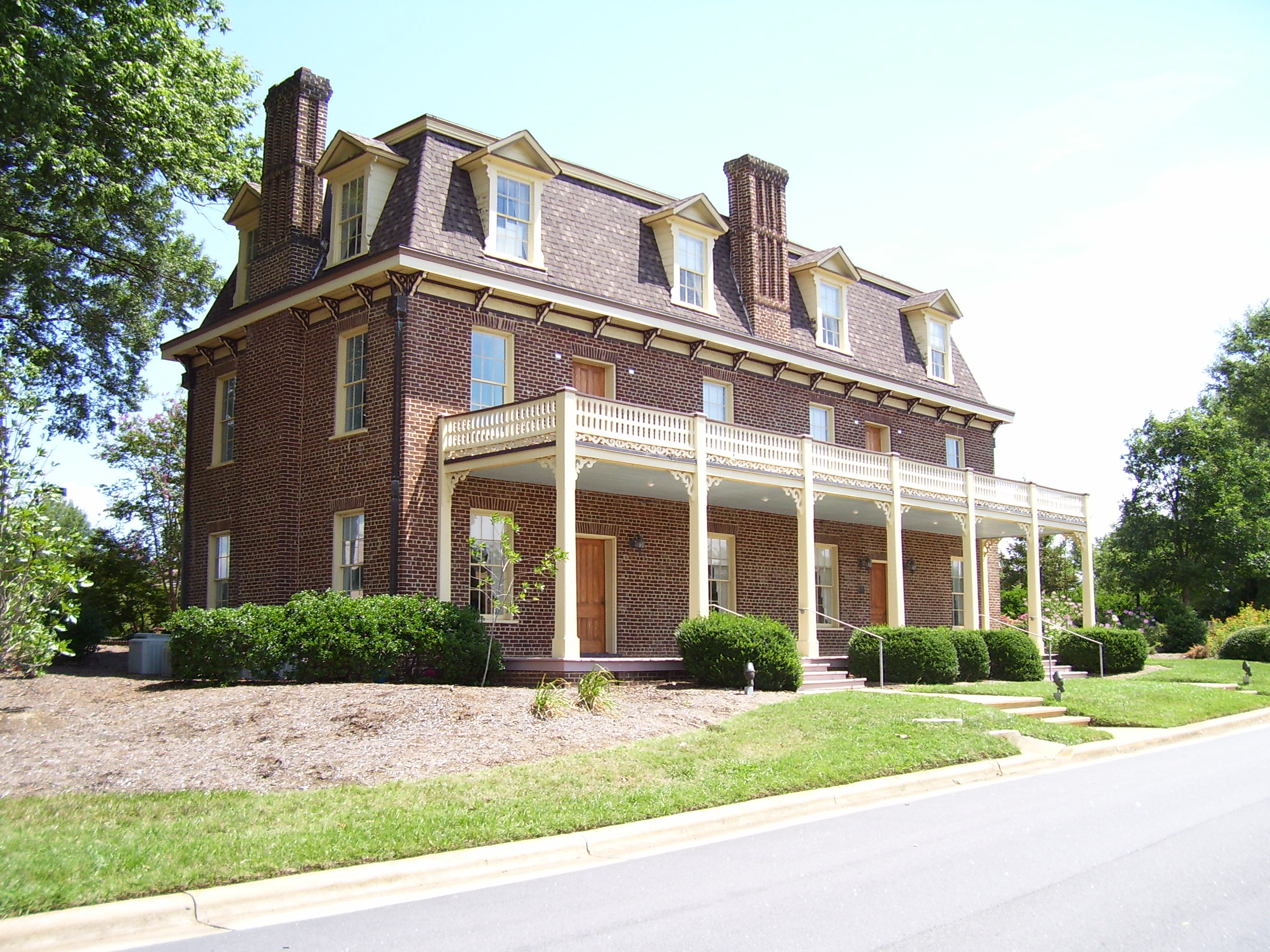
Page–Walker Hotel

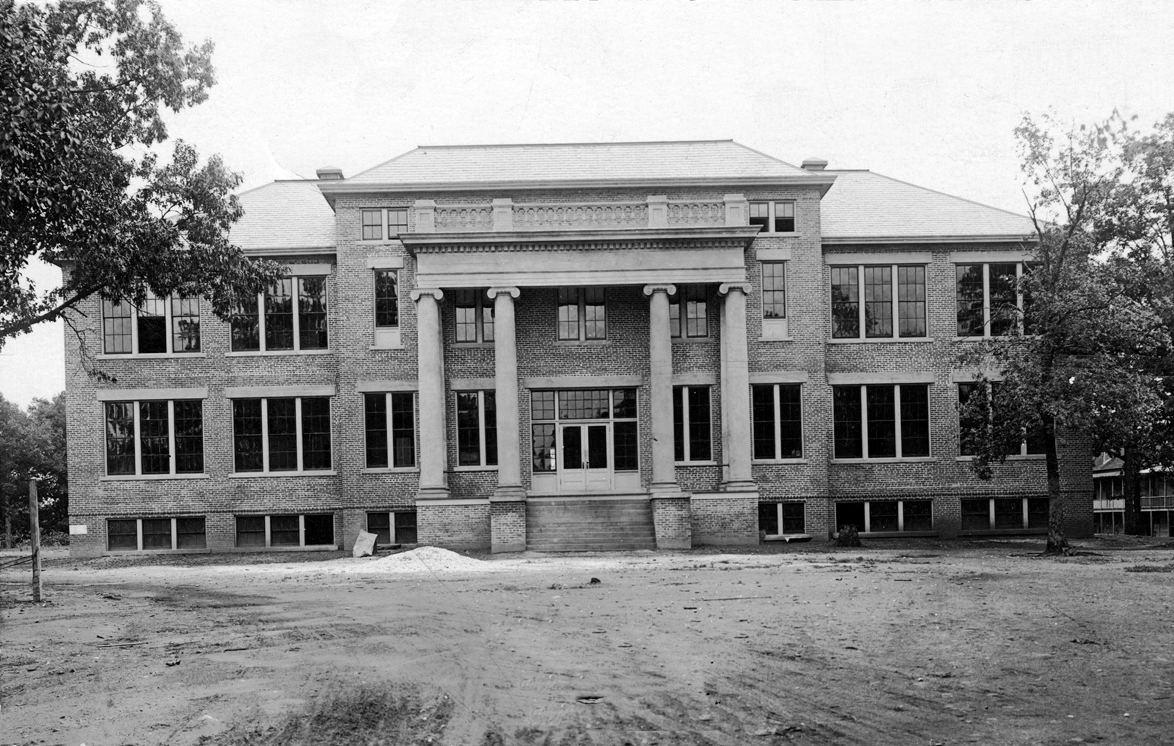
Cary High School, 1915

Before the arrival of European settlers, the Tuscarora and Catawba people lived in what is now called Cary. However, their numbers were greatly reduced due to smallpox epidemics, resulting from contact with Europeans who carried the disease and having no prior immunity.

In the 1750s, John Bradford moved to the area and opened an ordinary or inn, giving Cary its first name—Bradford's Ordinary. However, most of the land remained in the hands of two men, both named Nathaniel Jones. Arriving around 1775, Jones of White Plains plantation owned 10,461 acres (4,233 ha) in eastern Cary, while Jones of Crabtree owned most of what is now western Cary. After the Revolutionary War, the community was on the road between the new capital in Raleigh and the University of North Carolina in Chapel Hill. In the early 19th-century, Eli Yates added a gristmill and sawmill to the community, while Rufus Jones founded the first free school in the 1840s, along with Asbury Methodist Church, the community's first church.

In 1854, Bradford's Ordinary was linked to a major transportation route when the North Carolina Railroad came through the settlement, followed by the Chatham Railroad in 1868. The railroad tracks were laid mostly by enslaved people. Wake County farmer and lumberman Allison Francis Page also arrived in 1854 and is credited with founding the town. For $2,000, Page purchased 300 acres (121.4 ha) surrounding the planned railroad junction and built his home called Pages, a sawmill, and a general store. Page also donated 10 acres (4.0 ha) for a railroad depot.

The community was unofficially known as Page, Page's Siding, Page's Station, Page's Tavern, and Page's Turnout. In 1856, Page added a post office and became the town's first postmaster. Page named the community Cary because of his admiration for Samuel Fenton Cary, head of the Sons of Temperance in North America, who had delivered an oration in Raleigh two months prior.

The American Civil War did not come to Cary until April 16, 1865—the same day Confederate General Robert E. Lee surrendered—when 5,000 Confederate troops under General Wade Hampton III encamped there. The next day, Raleigh surrendered to Union General William T. Sherman, and Major General Francis Preston Blair Jr. led the XVII Corps (Union Army) into Cary and established headquarters at the Nancy Jones House, the former home of Jones of Crabtree that had become a tavern and stagecoach stop on the road between Raleigh and Chapel Hill. With Blair's arrival, Cary's enslaved population was emancipated; some went to Raleigh and joined the 135th U.S. Colored Troops. Blair remained in Cary until the surrender of Confederate General Joseph E. Johnston on April 27, 1865.

Cary's population grew after the Civil War with the completion of the Chatham Railroad junction. Around 1868, the town's first depot was built for the Chatham Railroad, and Page laid out 1 acre (0.40 ha) residential lots and streets, including Academy and Chatham Streets. At the time, most of Cary's men worked for the railroads, but other businesses included a furniture factory, two shingle factories, a tannery, a shoe factory, a brick factory, and a window sash and blind factory. Around 1868, Page also built a Second Empire style hotel for railroad passengers, known today as the Page-Walker Hotel.

Page, Adolphus Jones, and Rufus Jones established Cary Academy, a private boarding school later known as the Female Institute and Cary Female Academy. The two-story school was built in 1870 on Page's land at the end of Academy Street with lumber milled on-site by Page. Other additions to the town included Page's tobacco warehouse, First Methodist Church, First Baptist Church, and the Cary Colored Christian Church (the latter on land donated by Page), along with two free schools for whites and two free schools for blacks.

Cary was incorporated on April 3, 1871, with Page serving as the first mayor. Its boundaries were established as 1 sq mi (2.6 km^{2}), with the center being the Chatham Railroad warehouse. Because Page supported temperance, Cary's Act of Incorporation prohibited the sale of whiskey in the town's boundary and its surrounding 2 sq mi (5.2 km^{2}); an 1889 addition the Act of Incorporation also banned "any vinous, spirituous or malt liquors, cider or peach brandies". Page left Cary in 1880, following lumber opportunities in Moore County. However, Cary's prohibition law was in place until 1964 when it was superseded by State and county laws.

The Raleigh and Augusta Air–Line Railroad arrived in Cary in 1879, creating Fetner Junction just north of downtown and spurring further growth. Sixteen Cary residents purchased Cary Academy in 1896 and converted it into the private boarding school, Cary High School, which had 248 students from across the state by 1900. When the North Carolina legislature passed a law establishing a system of public high schools in 1907, Cary High School was transferred to the State for $2,750, giving Cary its claim of having the first state-funded public high school in the state. Town bonds and the State funded a new brick school building in 1913; it was expanded in 1939 with WPA assistance. Today that structure survives as the Cary Arts Center.

In the 1920s, the paved Western Wake Highway (now Western Blvd.) connected Cary to Raleigh via automobile, followed by paved roads to Durham and Apex. This enabled Cary's residents to commute for work, and the town's population grew by 64% during the decade. Electricity came to Cary in 1921. For the first time, Cary had housing developments, along with a volunteer fire department and municipal water and sewage system. A Masonic Lodge was added to downtown in the 1920s. During the Great Depression, the Bank of Cary failed, and the town went bankrupt. Conditions were so challenging that Cary had four mayors in two years.

In the 1930s, a new North Carolina State University research farm supported Cary's farmers. One Cary garden club began growing gourds and showed their products and related crafts at the North Carolina State Fair. After the club's first annual Gourd Festival in 1944, they sent exhibits to the International Gourd Society Festival in Pasadena, California and took many prizes This earned Cary the nickname "Gourd Capital of the World", a designation reflected by gourds circling the original version of the town seal. Now named North Carolina Gourd Festival, the annual event moved to the North Carolina State Fairgrounds in 2000.

After World War II, Cary began to attract industry, including the Taylor Biscuit Company (later Austin Foods), which became the town's largest employer with some 200 employees. Cary expanded its original single square mile boundary and created a Planning and Zoning Board in 1949. All the streets in Cary were paved by the early 1950s and residential suburbs began forming around the downtown area, including Veteran Hills, Russell Hills, and Montclair subdivisions. The town gained its first supermarket, Piggly Wiggly, in 1950, followed by the Cary Public Library in 1960, and a town-funded fire department in 1961.

The population and number of developments in Cary continued to increase in the 1960s and 1970s after the opening of the nearby Research Triangle Park (RTP) in 1959. This rapid growth was planned; the State built a four-lane road between Cary and the Research Triangle Park as part of the agreement to attract RTP to North Carolina. Historian Jordan R. Bauer says, "The sleepy town of Cary...was the ideal place for an emerging class of scientific and technical workers". Initially, Cary adopted zoning and other ordinances on an ad hoc basis to control growth and give the town structure, including its first subdivision regulations in 1961 and a zoning and land-use plan in 1963. To deal with the problem of overcrowding in schools, several new schools were constructed in the 1960s. Cary High School was the first school in Wake County to integrate in 1963. Other ways Cary dealt with the rapid growth in the 1960s was adopting subdivision regulations in 1961, updating zoning ordinances and their land use plan in 1963, and connecting to Raleigh's sewer and water systems in the early 1960s.

In 1971, the town created Planned Unit Development (PUD) zoning, which lets a developer plan an entire community before beginning construction, allowing future residents to know where churches, schools, commercial, and industrial areas will be located in advance. Developed on the Pine State Dairy's former Kildaire Farm, the 967-acre (391.3 ha) Kildaire Farms development in Cary was North Carolina's first PUD.

In 1960, Cary's population was 3,356 but by 1970, it had grown to 7,686. To preserve its small-town feel, of Cary formed the Community Appearance Commission in 1972, which focused on regulating the look of downtown through sign ordinances. The Land Dedication Ordinance of 1974 required developers to set aside one acre of green space for every 35 housing units constructed. During the 1980s, Cary created Industrial Performance Districts, which increased the town's tax base by encouraging businesses to build within the town's limits. Cary had its own sewer system by the 1980s. The PUD model became so popular in Cary that 22 more were created between 1980 and 1992.

By 2000, Cary's population had grown to 94,536. Concerned about forty years of steady growth, in 2008 the town council commissioned the Cary Historic Preservation Master Plan to establish a coordinated approach to historic preservation. Cary now has three districts recognized by the National Register of Historic Places: the Carpenter Historic District, the Green Level Historic District, and the Cary Historic District. In addition, the town has designed ten local landmarks which receive a property tax break in exchange for oversight of exterior changes to the structures by the town's Historic Preservation Commission.

== Geography ==
Located in the piedmont region of North Carolina, most of Cary is in western Wake County, with neighborhood-sized sections in the northeast corner of Chatham County and small portions of southwest Durham County. According to the United States Census Bureau, the town has a total area of 61.05 square miles (158.1 km^{2}), of which 59.94 square miles (155.2 km^{2}) is land and 1.11 square miles (2.9 km^{2}) (1.82%) is water. Cary is bordered on the north and east by Raleigh, generally toward the north by Research Triangle Park and Morrisville, on the south by Apex and Holly Springs, and on the west by the Jordan Lake area.

Cary is seated on the boundary between the Durham Basin with its softer sedimentary rocks and the piedmont with its harder metamorphic rocks; both geologic provinces have igneous rock intrusions. The landscape is typically gentle to moderate sloping hills separated by narrow V-shaped valleys, but there are areas with steeper slopes and broader, U-shaped valleys in western Cary, roughly along NC 55 near the Research Triangle Park and north of Green Hope School Road. Cary's average elevation is 495 ft (151 m).

The Cary drainage basin includes three main creeks—the Crabtree, the Swift, and the Walnut—which are all tributaries of the Neuse River. Most streams in the area have narrow floodplains with riverine wetlands, but Crabtree, Middle, Swift, and White Oak Creeks are larger and have broader floodplains. There are several small lakes in the area, most notably Lake Crabtree, created for flood control of Crabtree Creek. Jordan Lake is a large reservoir, flood control, and recreational facility that abuts part of western Cary.

Suburbanization is the typical land use in Cary. However, some areas are still undeveloped forests or agricultural, such as the agricultural areas west of NC 55 in Green Level, Upper Middle Creek and the Carpenter community. There is a mixture of mature conifers and broadleaf trees in Cary's parks, nature preserves, and older subdivisions such as Farmington Woods, Greenwood Forest, and Kildaire Farms because tree preservation was a key design element. According to the Town of Cary Land Use Plan, newer construction in Cary, both residential and commercial, shows "less regard for tree preservation and replanting."

=== Climate ===
Cary has a humid subtropical climate (Cfa) under the Köppen climate classification system, with hot summers, mildly cold winters with 3.2 in (8.1 cm) of snow annually, and several months of pleasant weather each year. Temperature extremes in Cary range from the single digits to over 100 °F (38 °C). Tropical cyclones can affect Cary, usually after weakening substantially from being over land. Some, such as Hurricane Fran in 1996, have caused great damage in the area.

Climate data for Cary, North Carolina (1991–2020 normals, extremes 2000–present)
Month	Jan	Feb	Mar	Apr	May	Jun	Jul	Aug	Sep	Oct	Nov	Dec	Year
Record high °F (°C)	80 (27)	80 (27)	89 (32)	92 (33)	96 (36)	101 (38)	101 (38)	101 (38)	97 (36)	97 (36)	85 (29)	78 (26)	101 (38)
Mean daily maximum °F (°C)	50.2 (10.1)	54.0 (12.2)	61.4 (16.3)	71.1 (21.7)	78.1 (25.6)	84.9 (29.4)	88.2 (31.2)	86.0 (30.0)	80.3 (26.8)	71.1 (21.7)	61.5 (16.4)	53.3 (11.8)	70.0 (21.1)
Daily mean °F (°C)	40.7 (4.8)	43.3 (6.3)	49.9 (9.9)	59.0 (15.0)	67.2 (19.6)	74.8 (23.8)	78.6 (25.9)	76.9 (24.9)	70.9 (21.6)	60.4 (15.8)	50.3 (10.2)	43.7 (6.5)	59.6 (15.3)
Mean daily minimum °F (°C)	31.2 (−0.4)	32.6 (0.3)	38.5 (3.6)	46.8 (8.2)	56.3 (13.5)	64.6 (18.1)	69.0 (20.6)	67.9 (19.9)	61.5 (16.4)	49.7 (9.8)	39.2 (4.0)	34.1 (1.2)	49.3 (9.6)
Record low °F (°C)	6 (−14)	7 (−14)	15 (−9)	27 (−3)	38 (3)	49 (9)	58 (14)	53 (12)	44 (7)	30 (−1)	20 (−7)	12 (−11)	6 (−14)
Average precipitation inches (mm)	3.54 (90)	2.90 (74)	4.04 (103)	3.73 (95)	3.74 (95)	4.59 (117)	5.31 (135)	4.81 (122)	5.57 (141)	3.54 (90)	3.50 (89)	3.53 (90)	48.80 (1,240)
Source: NOAA

== Demographics ==
Historical population
Census	Pop.	Note	%±
1880	316		—
1890	423		33.9%
1900	333		−21.3%
1910	383		15.0%
1920	645		68.4%
1930	909		40.9%
1940	1,141		25.5%
1950	1,446		26.7%
1960	3,356		132.1%
1970	7,686		129.0%
1980	21,763		183.2%
1990	43,858		101.5%
2000	94,536		115.6%
2010	135,234		43.1%
2020	174,721		29.2%
2025 (est.)	183,582	▲	5.1%
U.S. Decennial Census; 2020

As of the 2020 census, there were 174,721 residents of Cary residing in 62,789 households. The population density of Cary is 2,949.7 people per 1 sq mi (2.6 km^{2}), versus 1,353.3 for Wake County and 214.7 for North Carolina.

According to the American Community Survey, an estimated 68.4% of adults in Cary age 25 years or older have a bachelor's degree or higher. In addition, 98.6% of Cary's households are estimated to have a computer, and 96.0% have broadband.

=== Racial and ethnic composition ===
Cary town, North Carolina – Racial and ethnic composition Note: the U.S. census treats Hispanic/Latino as an ethnic category. This table excludes Latinos from the racial categories and assigns them to a separate category. Hispanics/Latinos may be of any race.
Race / Ethnicity (NH = Non-Hispanic)	Pop 2000	Pop 2010	Pop 2020	% 2000	% 2010	% 2020
White alone (NH)	75,299	93,202	99,357	79.65%	68.92%	56.87%
Black or African American alone (NH)	5,744	10,485	13,506	6.08%	7.75%	7.73%
Native American or Alaska Native alone (NH)	197	284	302	0.21%	0.21%	0.17%
Asian alone (NH)	7,636	17,620	39,035	8.08%	13.03%	22.34%
Native Hawaiian or Pacific Islander alone (NH)	25	39	76	0.03%	0.03%	0.04%
Other race alone (NH)	173	334	969	0.18%	0.25%	0.55%
Mixed race or Multiracial (NH)	1,415	2,906	7,100	1.50%	2.15%	4.06%
Hispanic or Latino (any race)	4,047	10,364	14,376	4.28%	7.66%	8.23%
Total	94,536	135,234	174,721	100.00%	100.00%	100.00%

During the 1970s and 1980s, the high number of non-native-born North Carolinians moving to the town for employment in the Research Triangle Park led native-born North Carolinians to refer to Cary derisively as "Containment Area for Relocated Yankees". As of the 2020 Census, 28.97% of Cary's population was born in North Carolina, 77.87% were born in the United States, and 22.13% were foreign-born.

== Economy ==
According to the 2021 census estimate, the median household income in Cary is $113,782 or $55,710 per capita. The percentage of Cary's residents living in poverty is 4.4%, and just 5.9% of its population under the age of 65 lacked health insurance. Between 2017 and 2021, the median value of owner-occupied houses in Cary was $404,300. The homeownership rate (owner-occupied housing units to total units) is 66.8%. However, there are growing concerns about Cary's lack of affordable housing. Over the past twenty years, Cary has added 10,000 jobs earning $35,000 or less; however, the cost of housing has increased significantly. The Town of Cary says that less than 20% of its employees can afford to live in the town. The median rental cost in Cary is $1,392 per month. The cost of living in Cary is rated at 115, with 100 being the national average.

=== Notable businesses ===
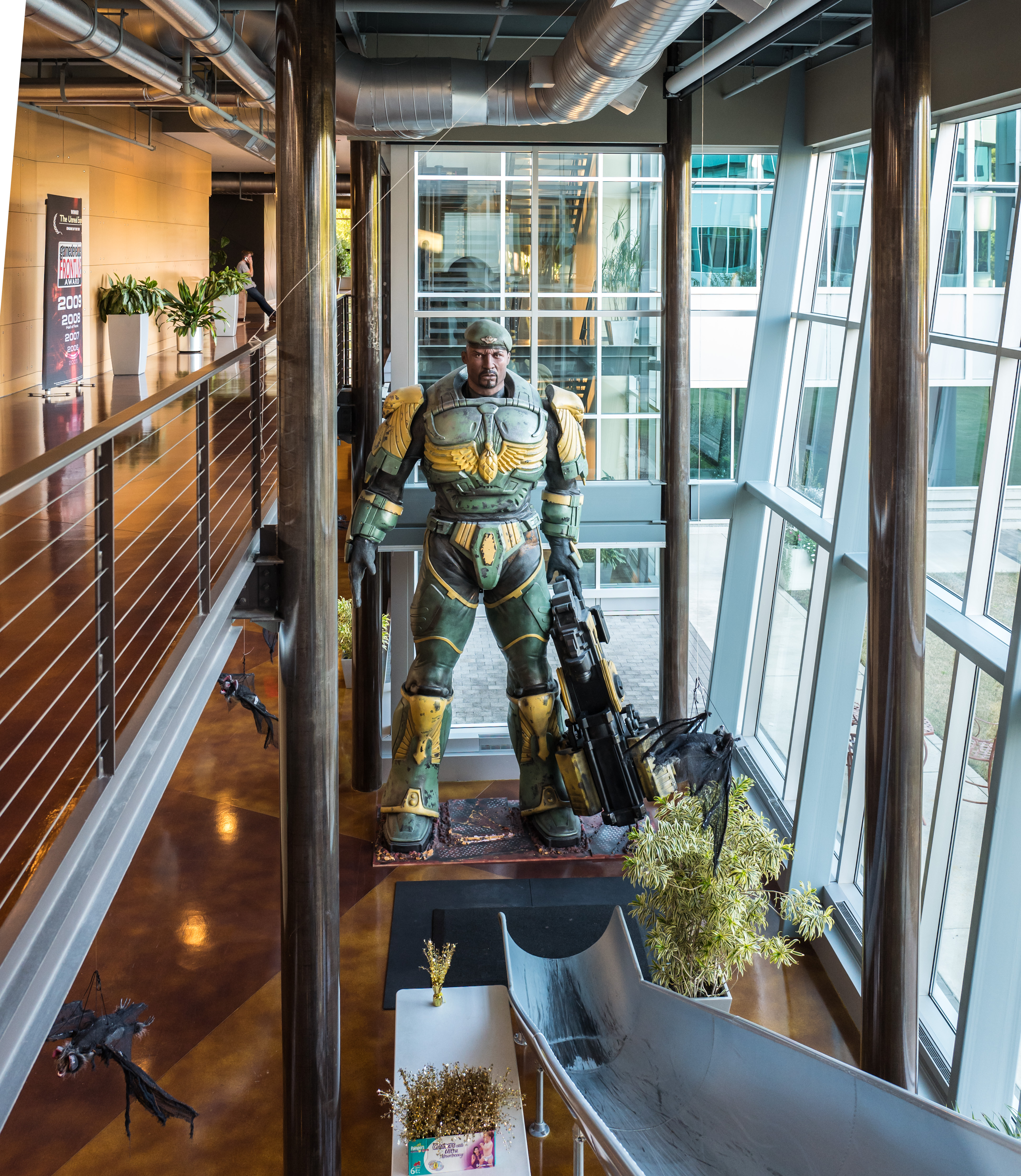
Epic Games's giant slide

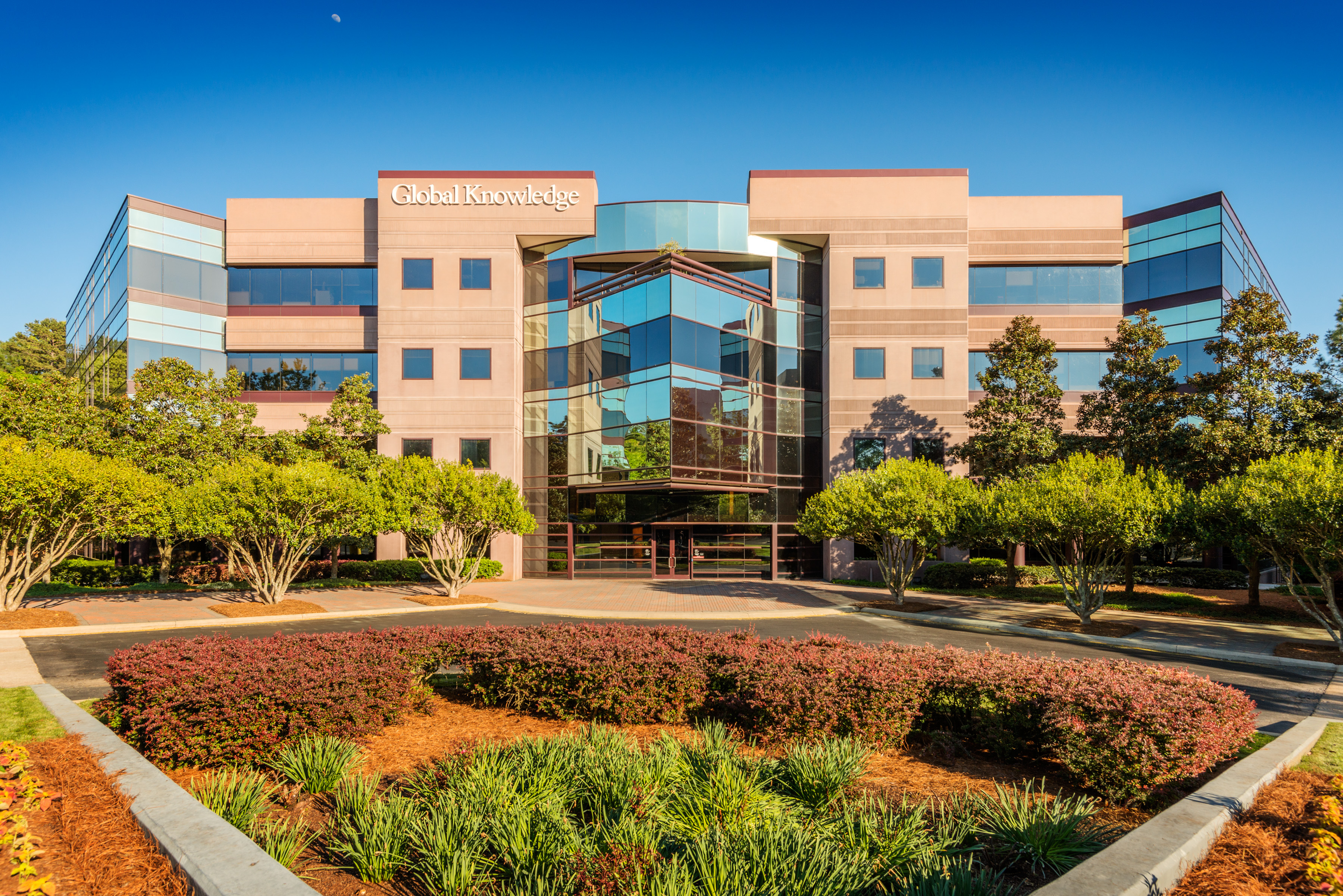
Global Knowledge headquarters

Notable technology companies located in Cary include ABB, Epic Games, Garmin, HCLTech, IntelliScanner Corporation, Lockheed Martin 3D Solutions, SAS Institute, VitalEdge Technologies, and Xerox.

Manufacturers located in Cary include Austin Foods/Kellogg's which makes snack foods, and Lord Corporation which makes adhesives, coatings, and motion management devices for aerospace and automobiles. Cotton Incorporated is a non–profit located in Cary which conducts worldwide research and promotes the use of cotton.

=== Top employers ===
According to Cary's 2024 Comprehensive Annual Financial Report, the top employers in the town are:

#	Employer	# of Employees
1	SAS Institute	4,024
2	MetLife	3,100
T–3	Verizon Business	2,000
T–3	Siemens Medical Solutions	2,000
5	HCLTech	1,600
6	Town of Cary	1,152
7	Precision Walls	1,073
T–8	ABB	1,000
T–8	Global Knowledge Training	1,000
10	American Airlines Reservation Center	964

== Arts and culture ==
=== Arts facilities and museums ===
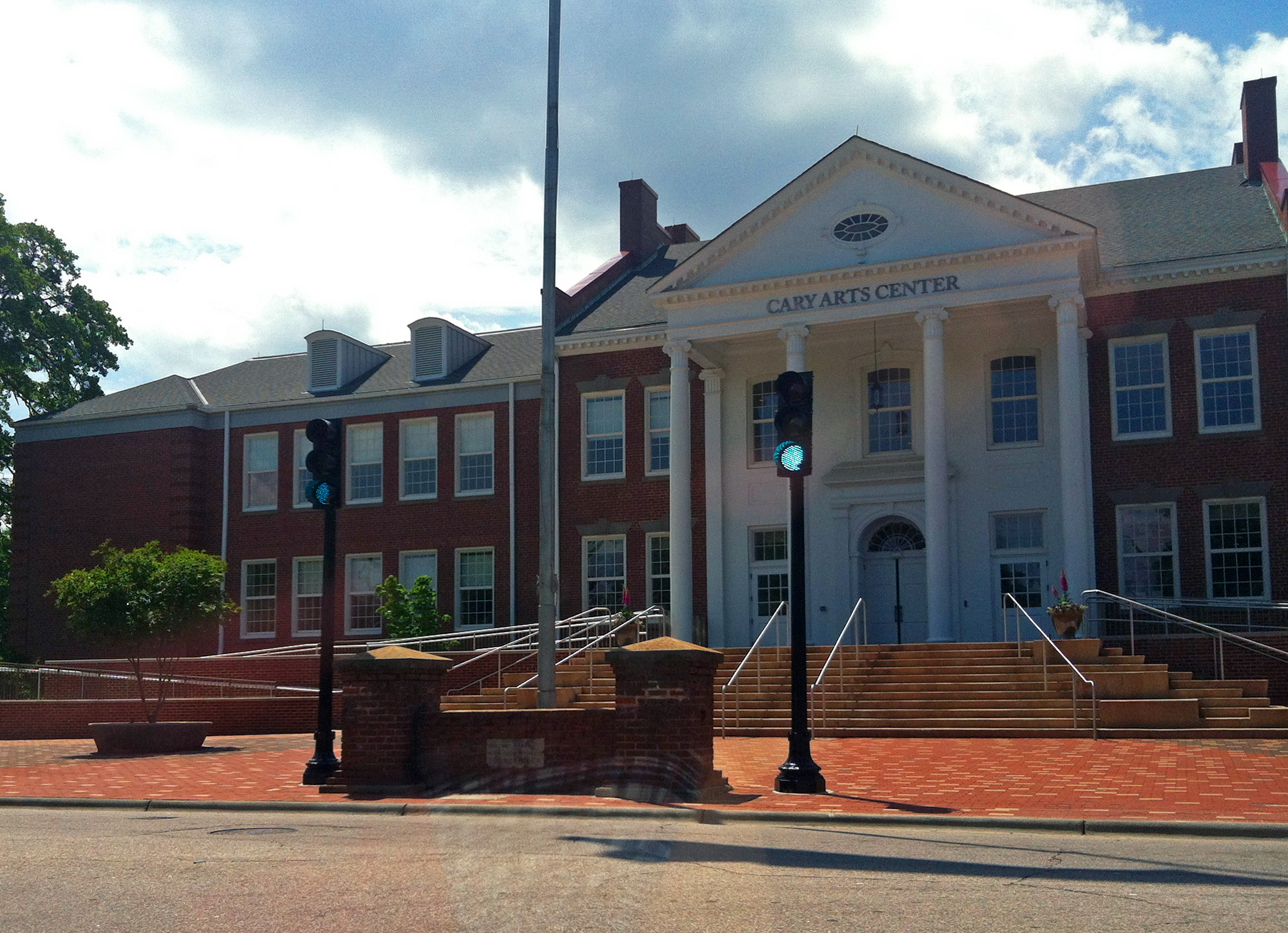
Cary Arts Center

Cary's public art collection includes more than forty works displayed in public spaces throughout the town. Many of the town's facilities include art gallery spaces with changing exhibits, including the Bond Park Community Center, the Cary Arts Center, the Cary Senior Center, the Cary Town Hall Gallery, the Herbert C. Young Community Center, and the Page–Walker Arts & History Center.

The Cary History Museum is located in the Page-Walker Arts and History Center and features a timeline exhibit of local history. The Stevens Nature Center is located at the Hemlock Bluffs Nature Preserve and has interactive nature and history exhibits. The BIG Pictures Museum Without Walls is the town's traveling outdoor exhibit.

Town-owned performance venues include the Cary Arts Center, Koka Booth Amphitheatre, and Sertoma Amphitheatre at Bond Park. The town also operates a multi-use cultural facility in a renovated movie theater called The Cary Theater.

=== Events and festivals ===
The Cary community supports a wide variety of public events throughout the year. An annual tradition since 1959, Cary Band Day brings high school marching bands from across the southeast to compete in one of the oldest and best-known regional competitions. Cary supports artists with two festivals: Spring Daze Arts & Crafts Festival and Lazy Daze Arts & Crafts Festival. For the latter, the town closes the main downtown roads for two days, a tradition since 1976.

Numerous multicultural events showcase the diversity of Cary. The annual Diwali Celebration, the Indian Festival of Light, features an exhibition of Indian art and culture with music, dance, handicrafts, and food. Presented by Asian Focus and the town, the Greater Triangle Area Dragon Boat Festival includes displays, food, performances, and dragon boat races between club and community teams. Founded in 2004, the Ritmo Latino Festival showcases music, art, dance, and food from the Hispanic world. One of the newest annual events in Cary, the North Carolina Chinese Lantern Festival is quickly becoming a town favorite with its illuminating nighttime celebration of the Chinese New Year with more than 2,500 handcrafted silk lanterns.

=== Architecture ===
The oldest structures in Cary, the c. 1803 Nancy Jones House and the c. 1820 Utley–Council House are both examples of regional Federal architecture. The c. 1868 Page–Walker Hotel was built in Empire style; the former hotel is now open to the public as a museum.

The Cary Historic District is located two blocks south of downtown and includes a variety of 19th and 20th-century structures of note. Architectural styles that were popular in the 19th century are represented by the Gothic revival Ivey–Ellington House built c. 1870, the simple Victorian style of the Marcus Baxter Dry House built c. 1900, and the Queen Anne style of the Sam–Jones cottage built c. 1902 and the Captain Harrison P. Guess House (aka the Guess–White–Ogle House) built in 1830 and 1900. Other structures in the Cary Historic District represent early 20th-century architectural styles such as the Tudor Revival style c. 1940 Henry Adams House, the Colonial Revival style c. 1935 Dr. Frank W. House, and the brick bungalow style c. 1925 Dr. John Pullen Hunter House. The district also includes the former Cary High School which is a substantial Neo Classical structure that was designed and built in 1939 by the Works Progress Administration, and the related Pasmore House, dating from c. 1900, which was a boarding house for the former high school. The former school is open to the public as the Cary Arts Center.

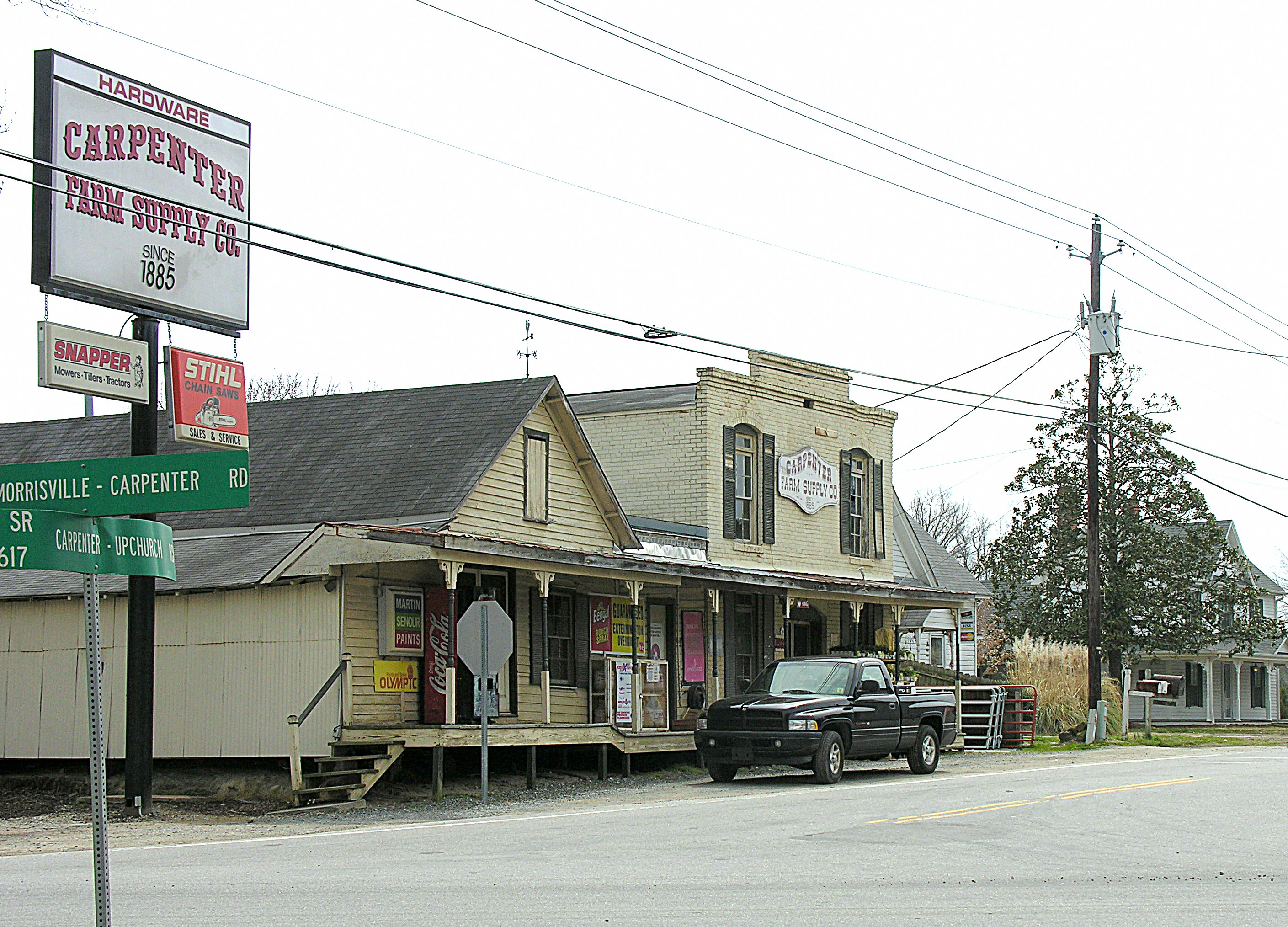
Carpenter Farm Supply Company

Located in western Cary, the 210 acres (85 ha) Carpenter Historic District is a former rural crossroads that features late Victorian and Colonial Revival buildings, dating from 1895 to 1933. The primary structure in the district is the c. 1895/1916 brick Carpenter Farm Supply Company which has been described as "the most substantial early twentieth-century store building in rural Wake County". Other contributing buildings to the historic district include houses, an assemblage of farming structures, and other commercial structures. The most prominent house is the William Henry Carpenter Boarding House which features a simple Victorian porch and gable ornamentation and was used as a residence for railroad workers. Cary's Green Level Historic District is located in western Cary, just east of the Chatham County line in the White Oak township. Its 75 acres (30 ha) includes a late 19th to early 20th-century crossroads centered around the intersection of Green Level Church Road and Green Level West Road and a railroad spur. Most historic structures in the district are along Green Level Church Road, including community buildings, farms, houses, and stores. The 1907 Green Level Baptist Church is one of the best examples of rural church architecture in Wake County. This Gothic Revival church was the "visual and social focal point of the community". The A.M. and Vallaria Council Farm is a good example of a late 19th-century tobacco farm, with its related tobacco barns and other secondary buildings dating to the 1900s through the 1930s. The c. 1916 Alious H. and Daisey Mills farmhouse is the largest building in the historic district and features a hip roof and slender Doric columns on its porch. It is located across the road and east of the church, on property that includes other historic houses, including a store and farm buildings ranging from a potato shed to a well-house. The two-story Alious Mills Store was built around 1916 and expanded in the 1930s. The one-story Vick and Mattie Council House was built in the 19th century and featured Victorian detailing, such as patterned shingles and decorative vents. The one-story Kenneth and Reba Mills House is an example of a 1930s Tudor Revival.

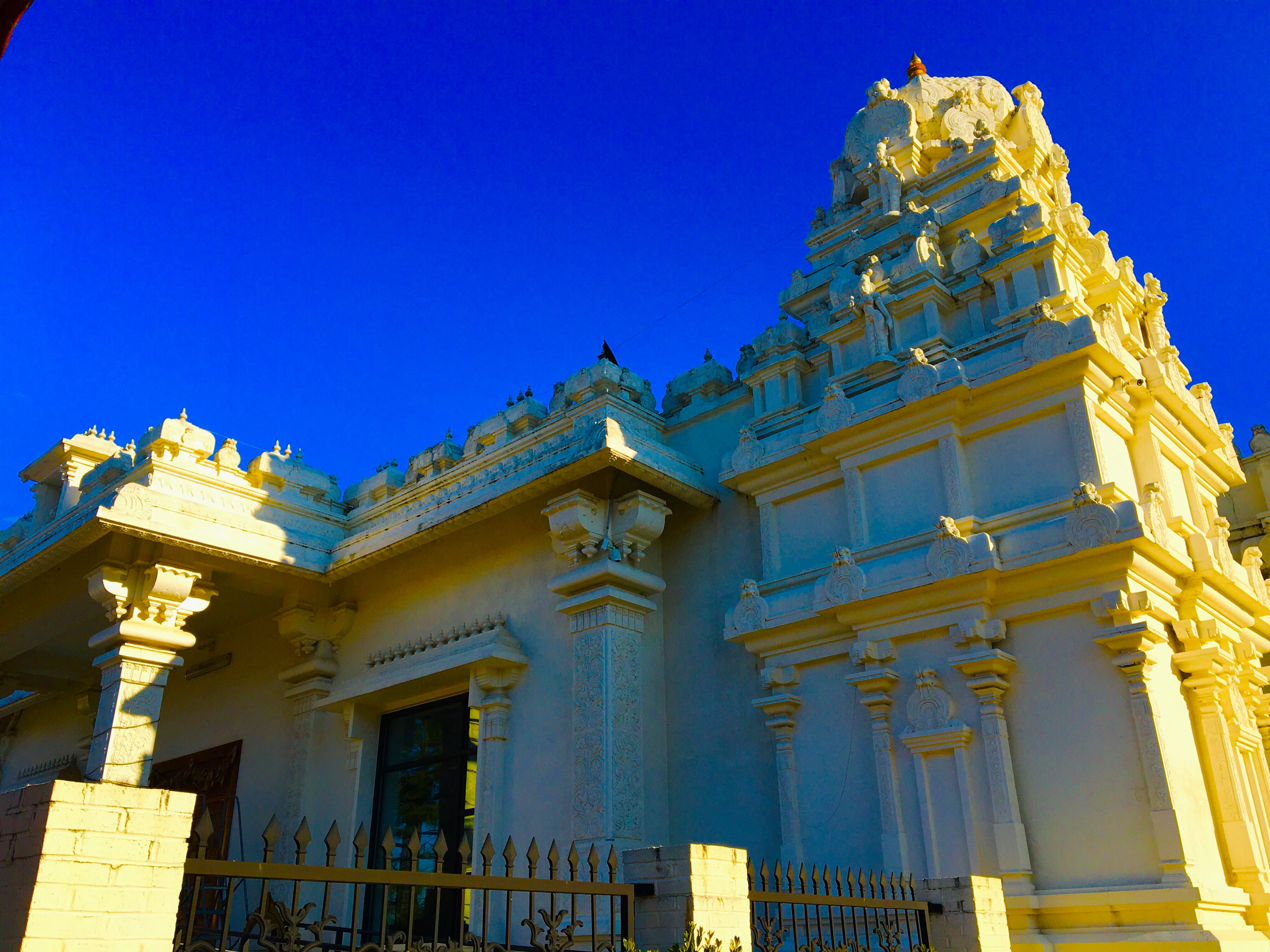
Sri Venkateswara Temple

SAS Institute has led the way in bringing modern high-rise architecture to Cary but has placed its 25 buildings in a 900 acres (360 ha) parklike setting away from the historic core of town. SAS's Building A is ten stories tall with 990 offices and several two-story atriums. One writer notes, "The design of its headquarters reflects both its status as a tech giant and its original academic routes." For example, eight solar installations power part of the SAS campus. Building Q is a six-story 22,000 sq ft (2,000 m^{2}) LEED Gold certified office building that is not only sustainable with features such as a green roof, but is also "light-filled, comfortable, and functional" according to LS3P architects. Building Q also has artwork on every floor; the SAS art collection includes some 4,600 works.

Cary is also home to the Sri Venkateswara Temple which has an 87 ft (27 m) tall Rajagopuram, or monumental entrance tower, making it the tallest structure of its kind in the United States. This Hindu temple is modeled after the famous Sri Venkateswara Temple in Tirupathi in the state of Andhra Pradesh, India.

== Sports ==
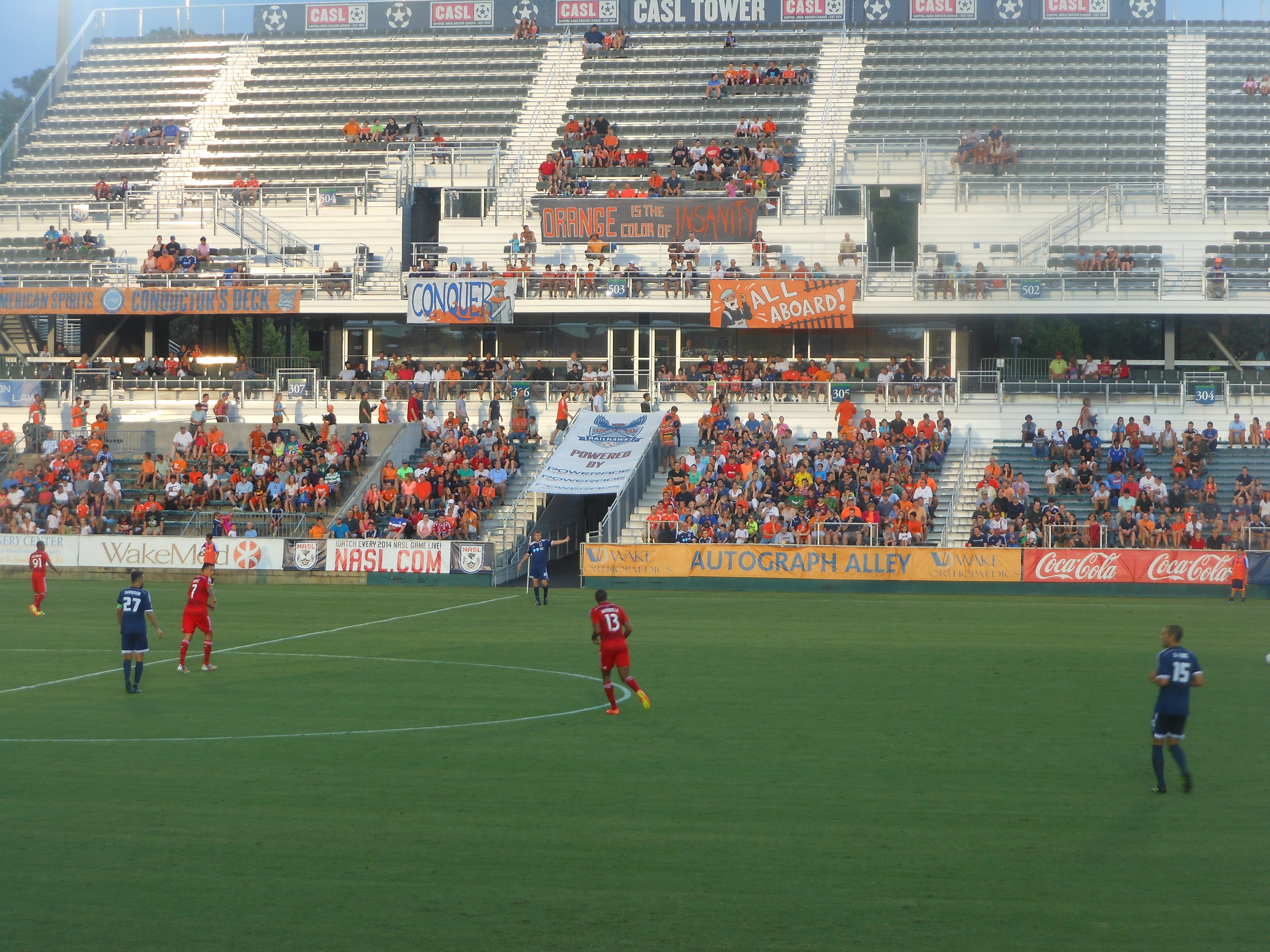
Carolina Railhawks vs. F.C. Dallas in a 2014 U.S. Open Cup match in WakeMed Soccer Park

Cary is home to two professional sports teams: the North Carolina Courage (NWSL) and the North Carolina FC (USL Championship). First Horizon Stadium at WakeMed Soccer Park in Cary is the home venue for both soccer teams.

Club	Sport	Founded	League	Venue
North Carolina FC	Soccer	2006	USL Championship	WakeMed Soccer Park
North Carolina Courage	Soccer	2009	NWSL	WakeMed Soccer Park

WakeMed Soccer Park has been the host site for the NCAA Division I men's soccer tournament. As of 2007, Cary is also home of the USA Baseball National Training Complex, located within the 221-acre (89 ha) Thomas Brooks Park. The complex was selected to host the NCAA Division II baseball tournament in 2009–2016, 2018–2019, and 2021 to date.

== Parks and recreation ==
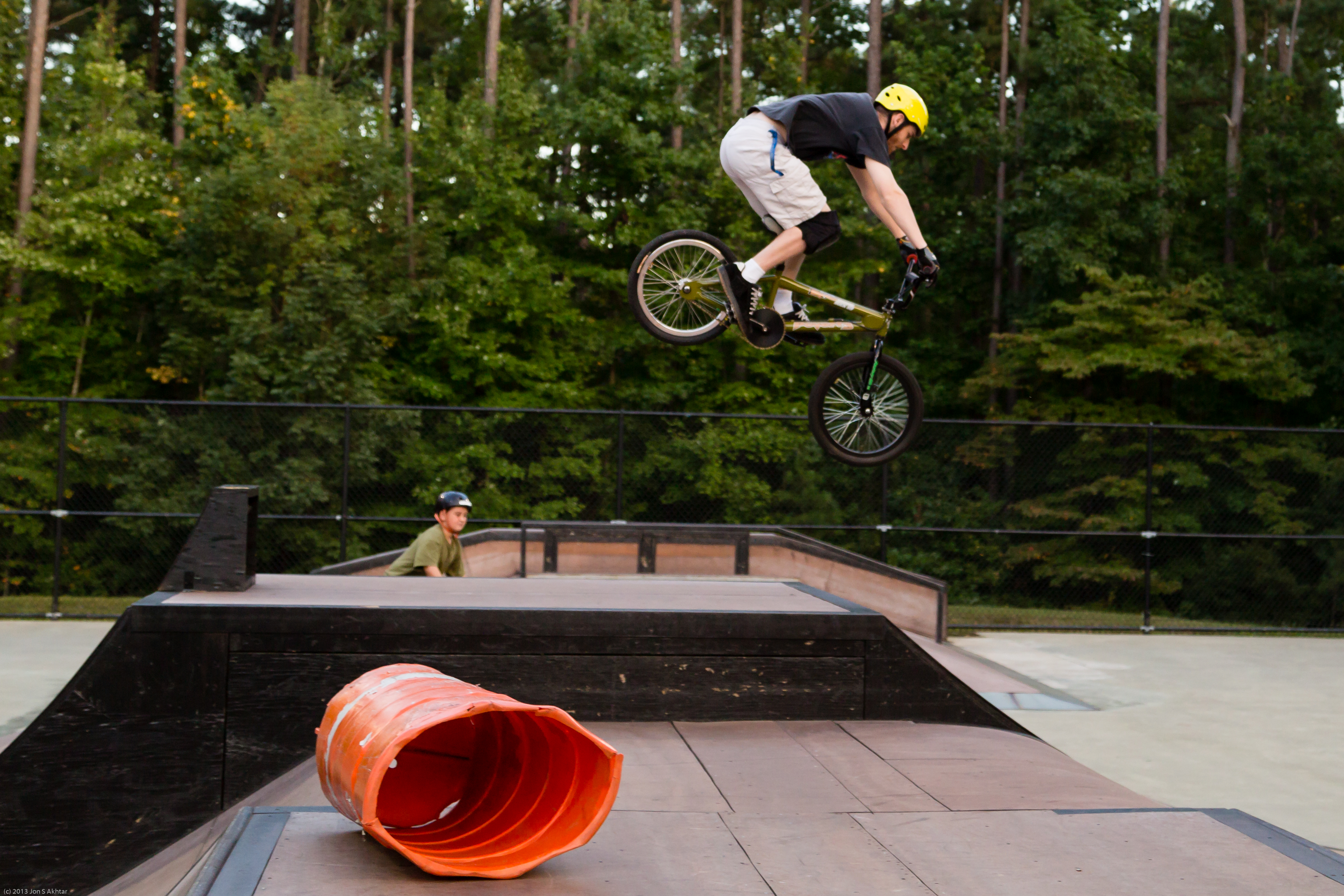
Cary Action Sports Skate Park

Cary has more than thirty public parks and natural areas. Notable parks include the new urban Downtown Cary Park, Fred G. Bond Metro Park, Hemlock Bluffs Nature Preserve, and William B. Umstead State Park.

=== Tennis ===
The 24-acre (9.7 ha) Cary Tennis Park is one of the most extensive public tennis facilities in the southeastern United States and features 32 courts, including a championship stadium. In 2019, the facility was one of 25 locations in the United States recognized for "excellence in the construction" by the United States Tennis Association.

== Government ==
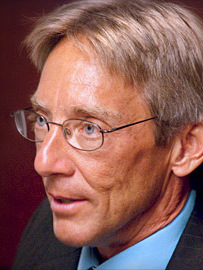
Mayor Harold Weinbrecht

Despite its sizable population, Cary is classified as a "town" because that is how it was incorporated with the State; North Carolina has no legal distinction between a city and a town for size. Cary has a council-manager government; the mayor and council members serve a four-year term, with half of the council seats being up for election each odd-numbered year. Four of the six council seats are elected by single-member districts; the remaining two seats are elected as at-large representatives, meaning they must attract a majority of votes across the whole town. Notable mayors include Fred Bond Jr. (1971–1983), Koka Booth (1987–1999), Glen Lang (1999–2003), and Harold Weinbrecht (2007–present).

As of February 2026, the town council consists of mayor Harold Weinbrecht and representatives Brittany Richards (District A, Mayor Pro Tem), Michelle Craig (District B), Bella Huang (District C), Sarika Bansal (District D), Lori Bush (at-large), and Carissa Kohn-Johnson (at-large). On October 9, 2007, Weinbrecht defeated incumbent mayor Ernie McAlister in the 2007 mayoral election. Citizen concerns that rapid growth was adversely affecting infrastructure and environment over the effect rapid growth was having on the town, especially on roads, schools, and the environment, led to McAlister's ouster and Weinbrecht's reelection in 2011, 2015, and 2019, and 2023.

== Education ==
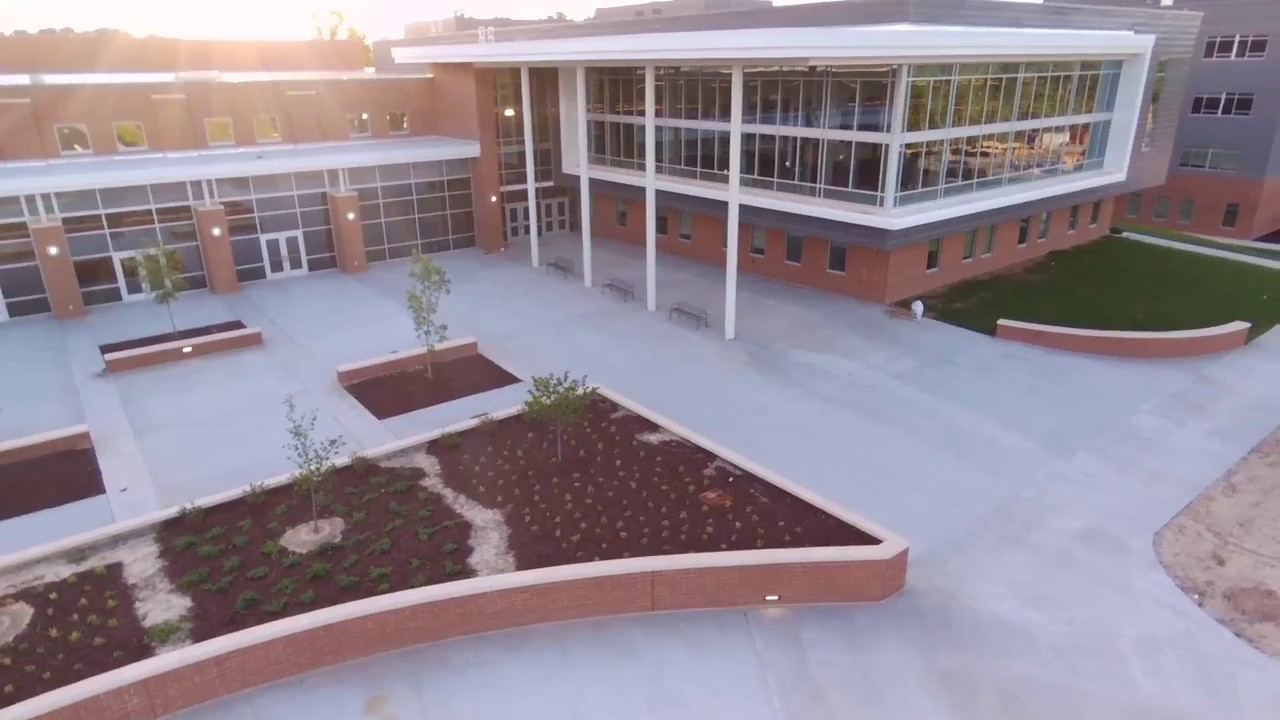
Green Level High School

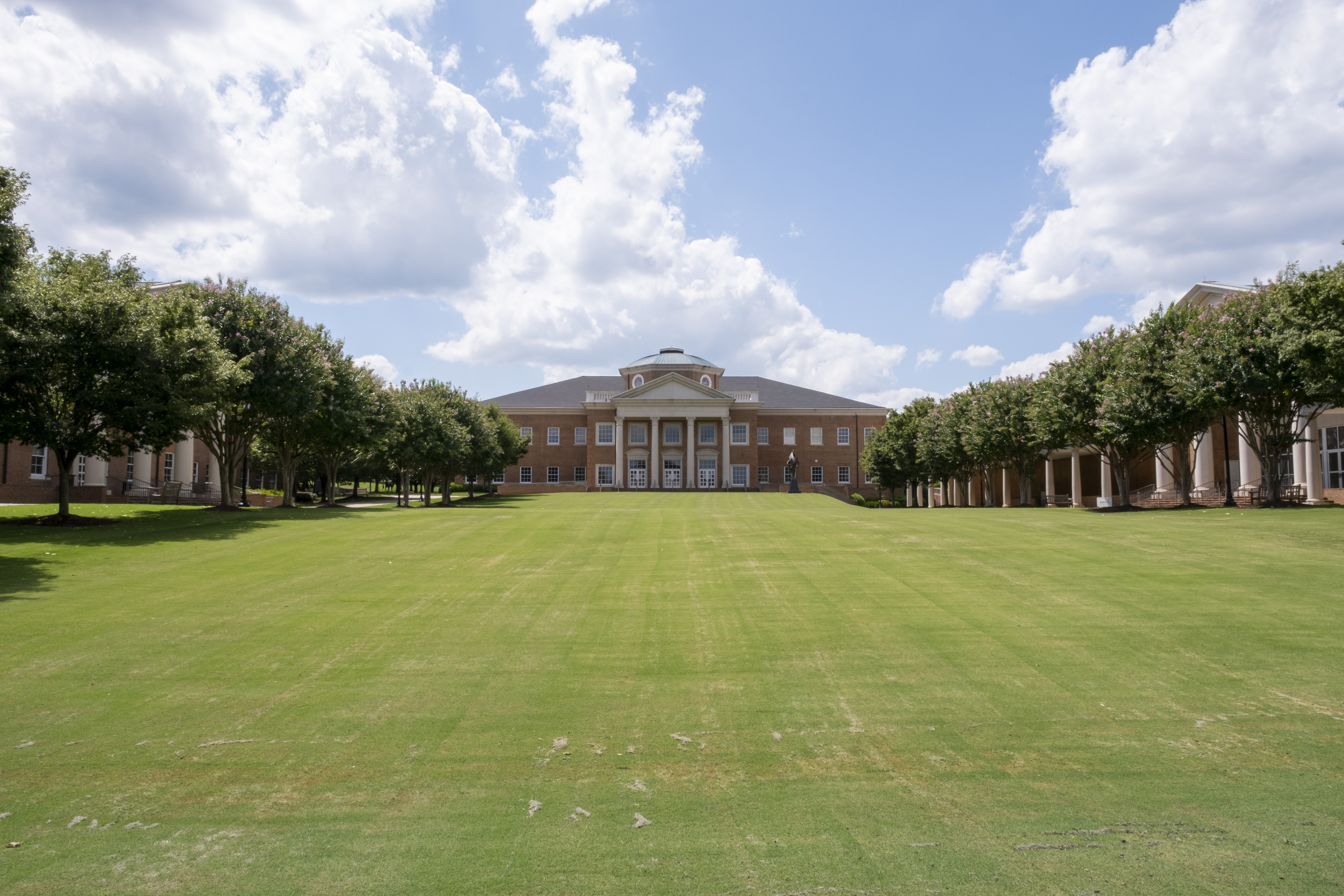
Cary Academy

=== Public schools ===
Headquartered in Cary, the Wake County Public School System is the largest public school system in North Carolina. Cary has five public high schools: Cary High School, Green Hope High School, Green Level High School, Middle Creek High School, and Panther Creek High School. The town has seven middle schools and nineteen elementary schools that are part of the Wake County system.

Cary has three charter schools: the K–8 grade Cardinal Charter Academy, the K–7 grade Peak Charter Academy, and the K–11 grade Triangle Math and Science Academy.

=== Private schools ===
- Cary Academy, 6–12 grade
- Cary Christian School, K–12 grade
- Chesterbrook Academy, K–5 grade
- Grace Christian School Upper Campus, 7–12 grade
- Heartwood Montessori School, K–12 grade
- Hopewell Academy, 6–12 grade
- Resurrection Lutheran School, K–8th grade
- Saint Michael the Archangel Catholic School, PK–8 grade

=== Higher education ===
Wake Technical Community College's Western Wake Campus is located on Kildaire Farm Road in Cary.

== Infrastructure ==
=== Transportation ===
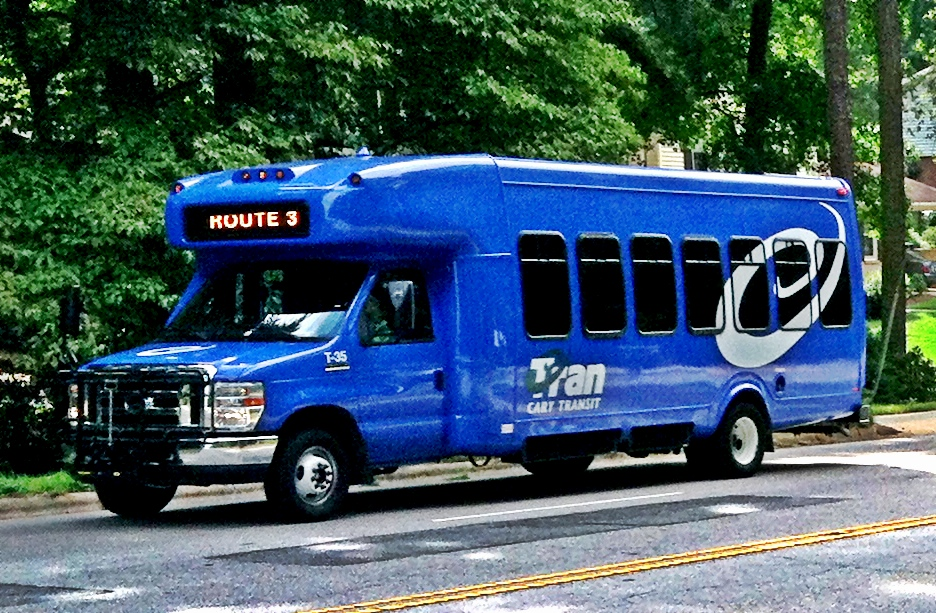
GoCary bus

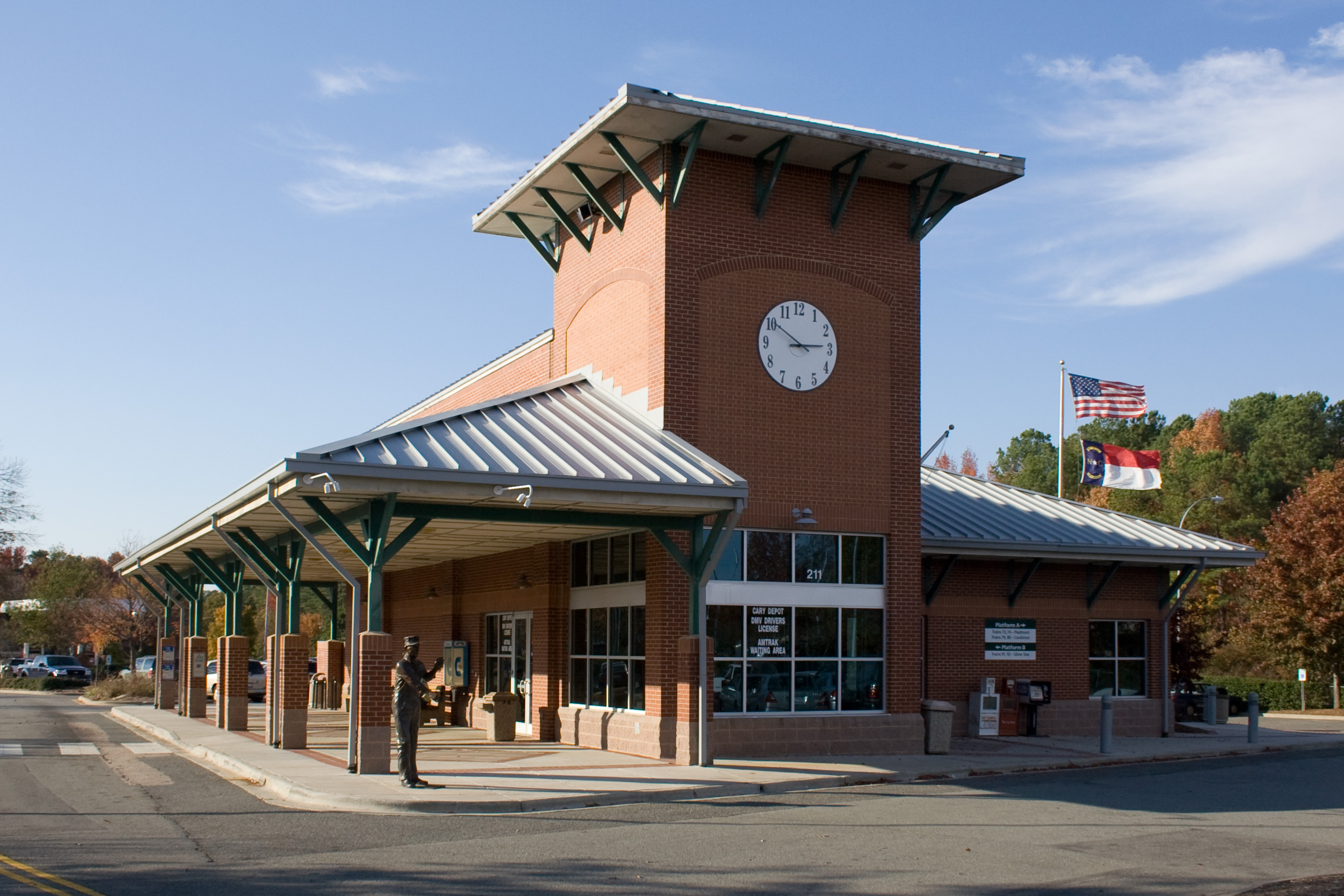
Amtrak Station

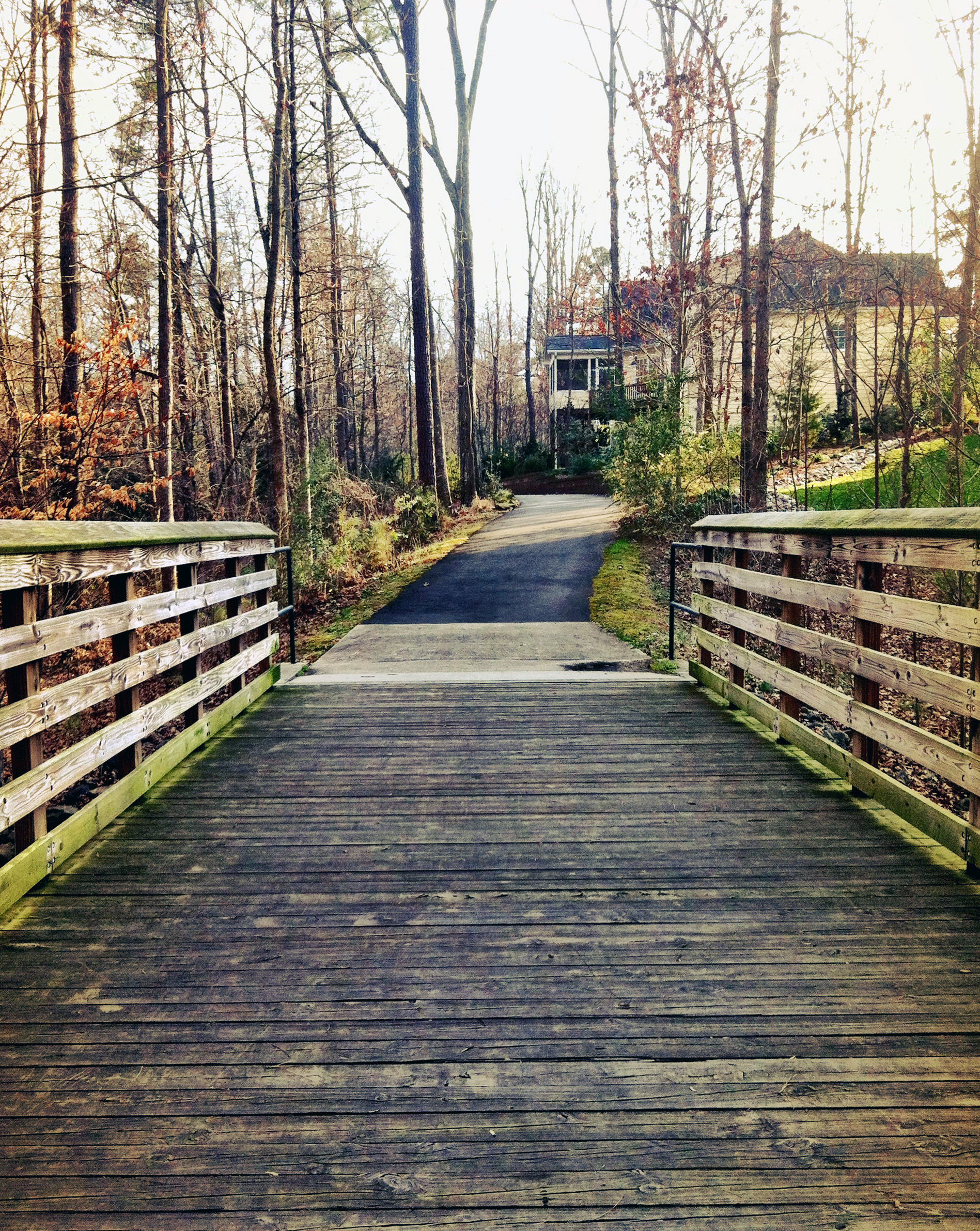
Cary Greenway

==== Public transit ====
Public transit within the town is provided by GoCary, with six fixed–routes. There is a door-to-door service for senior citizens and riders with disabilities. GoTriangle operates fixed-route buses that serve Wake County and connect to Go transit systems in Raleigh, Durham, and Chapel Hill.

==== Intercity rail ====
Amtrak's Silver Star, Carolinian, and Piedmont passenger trains stop at the Cary Station, providing service to Charlotte, New York City, Miami, and intermediate points. Constructed in 1995 and expanded in 2011, the station was the fifth-busiest in the state in 2024 and includes 130 free parking spaces.

==== Bicycle ====
In 2010, the League of American Bicyclists designated Cary as one of the fourteen recipients of the first Bicycle-Friendly Community awards for "providing safe accommodation and facilities for bicyclists and encouraging residents to bike for transportation and recreation". Cary maintains over 200 mi (320 km) of bike-friendly road and greenways facilities. In addition, U.S. Bicycle Route 1 (Carolina Connector) and N.C. Bicycle Route #2, (Mountains to Sea), both pass through suburban Cary.

==== Pedestrian ====
Cary maintains a network of 82 mi (132 km) of greenways and trails that connect neighborhoods and parks throughout the town. The 23 mi (37 km) American Tobacco Trail, built on a retired section of railroad, passes through parts of Cary.

==== Air transit ====
The Raleigh–Durham International Airport (RDU) is north of Cary (Cary provides water to the airport) and covers 80 nonstop destinations via 19 carriers. RDU served nearly 15.5 million passengers in 2024, eclipsing the pre-COVID-19 pandemic high of 14.2 million in 2019.

==== Freeways and primary routes ====
Cary is linked to areas both in and out of North Carolina via the east–west running Interstate 40, the north–south running U.S. 1, and the east–west running U.S. 64. State highways in Cary include NC 54, NC 55, and NC 540. Another major route in the town is the Cary Parkway. This roadway network is associated with comparatively low traffic fatality rates; a 2025 analysis of federal crash data found that Cary recorded the lowest per-capita fatal motor vehicle crash rate among U.S. cities with populations over 125,000.

=== Health care ===
Cary has many choices for primary care physicians, including practices that are connected to Duke University Health System, UNC Medical Center, UNC Rex Healthcare, and WakeMed. WakeMed Cary Hospital, a full-service hospital with 208 acute care beds, is also located in Cary.

=== Utilities ===
Duke Energy provides electricity for Cary. Dominion Energy has provided natural gas to Cary since 2019, when it acquired the Public Service Company of North Carolina. Cary's primary water source is the B. Everett Jordan Reservoir (also known as Jordan Lake), which is treated at the Cary/Apex Water Treatment Facility. Water and sewage accounts are overseen by the Town of Cary. Cary also provides bi-weekly curbside recycling.

=== Smart city technology ===
In 2016, Cary created its Simulated Smart City Program, which allows the town to test and evaluate Internet of Things (IoT) and smart city technologies in its town hall campus. Technologies already tested and expanded into the community include sensors for public parking that reveal available spots, smart street lights that dim when not needed, smart trash and recycling containers that message when they are full, and free outdoor Wi-Fi via beacons. The first town-wide IoT project was a smart water monitoring system with analytics from the SAS Institute, which can detect leaks. The National Recreation and Park Association noted, "These technologies offer more than just cost savings for the city of Cary. They also provide convenient quality-of-life improvements for citizens, and in many cases help lower environmental waste." Cary and SAS also collaborated on an IoT stormwater flood alert system, winning the 2020 IDC Smart Cities North American Awards (Smart Water Category) and the 2020 Government Innovation Award (Leveraging IoT for Increased Flood Protection).

In 2021, Cary installed IoT and smart city technologies that give emergency vehicles faster access through pedestrian crossings, railroad crossings, school zones, and traffic lights. This is the first citywide system like this in North Carolina. Paid for by the town with a matching grant from the U.S Department of Transportation, this project involved fifteen pedestrian crossings, 100 school safety beacons, 205 traffic signals, and railroad crossings.

In late 2021, Cary announced a new tech-focused Center of Excellence that brings together the town, SAS, and Semtech Corporation, to create new community services and expand the digital infrastructure. Connected World says, "In the quest for developing smarter cities across the country, ...the town of Cary, N.C., is one of the smartest towns in the United States".

== Sister cities ==
The Sister Cities Association of Cary has created long–term relationships with five sister cities:

- Le Touquet-Paris-Plage, France (1992)
- Hsinchu, Taiwan (1993)
- (Republic of Ireland) County Meath, Ireland (2001)
- Markham, Canada (2002)
- Bandırma, Turkey (2022)

== See also ==
- List of municipalities in North Carolina
