= VitalEdge Technologies =

American software company

- Type: Private
- Industry: Software, IT
- Founded: 1999; 27 years ago in Cary, North Carolina
- Founder: Milind Bagade (co-founder)
- Headquarters: Cary, North Carolina
- Area served: Global
- Services: Software for heavy equipment dealers
- Number of employees: Approximately 900 (2025)
- Website: vitaledge.com

VitalEdge Technologies is an American software company that develops software for equipment dealerships in the agriculture, forestry, mining, sanitation, and construction and material handling industries. In 2023, Financial Times included the company in a list of 500 of "The Americas' Fastest-Growing Companies". It was also included, at number 48, in Triangle Business Journal's "Fast 50 Awards" in 2023.

== History ==
VitalEdge Technologies (formerly e-Emphasys Technologies) was founded in 1999 and developed its eXtend ERP platform in 2003. The software platform is used for dealerships of heavy equipment. By 2019, the company expanded to include business intelligence and reporting, mobile field service applications, inspection apps, eCommerce customer portals, RFID, IoT, and telematics and AI. In 2022, private equity firms TA Associates and True Wind Capital announced a "strategic growth investment" in e-Emphasys.

In 2024, e-Emphasys Technologies announced it changed its name to VitalEdge Technologies, approximately nine months after it acquired CDK Global Heavy Equipment, provider of the IntelliDealer dealer management system. E-Emphasys and IntelliDealer remained the brand names for the dealer management software suites and associated applications.

In 2025, VitalEdge Technologies acquired US-based Integrated Rental, which develops rental software systems for heavy equipment dealers and rental companies. Later in 2025, VitalEdge Technologies launched "Insights Agent", a product of the VitalEdge AI Labs. In the same year, the company reportedly had approximately 900 employees and its technology was used in 4,300 dealer locations in more than 20 countries.

== Awards and recognition ==
- 2019 - Inc. 5000 - Fasted Growing Companies
- 2023 - Financial Times - Ranked among 500 of "The Americas' Fastest-Growing Companies"
- 2023 - Triangle Business Journal - Fast 50 Awards #48
- 2026 - TITAN Business Award - Gold for Information Technology: AI and Automation
- 2026 - Silver Stevie Award in the "Technical Innovation of the Year - Agricultural Technology" category
