= Nancy Jones House =

Historic house in Cary, North Carolina, US

- U.S. National Register of Historic Places
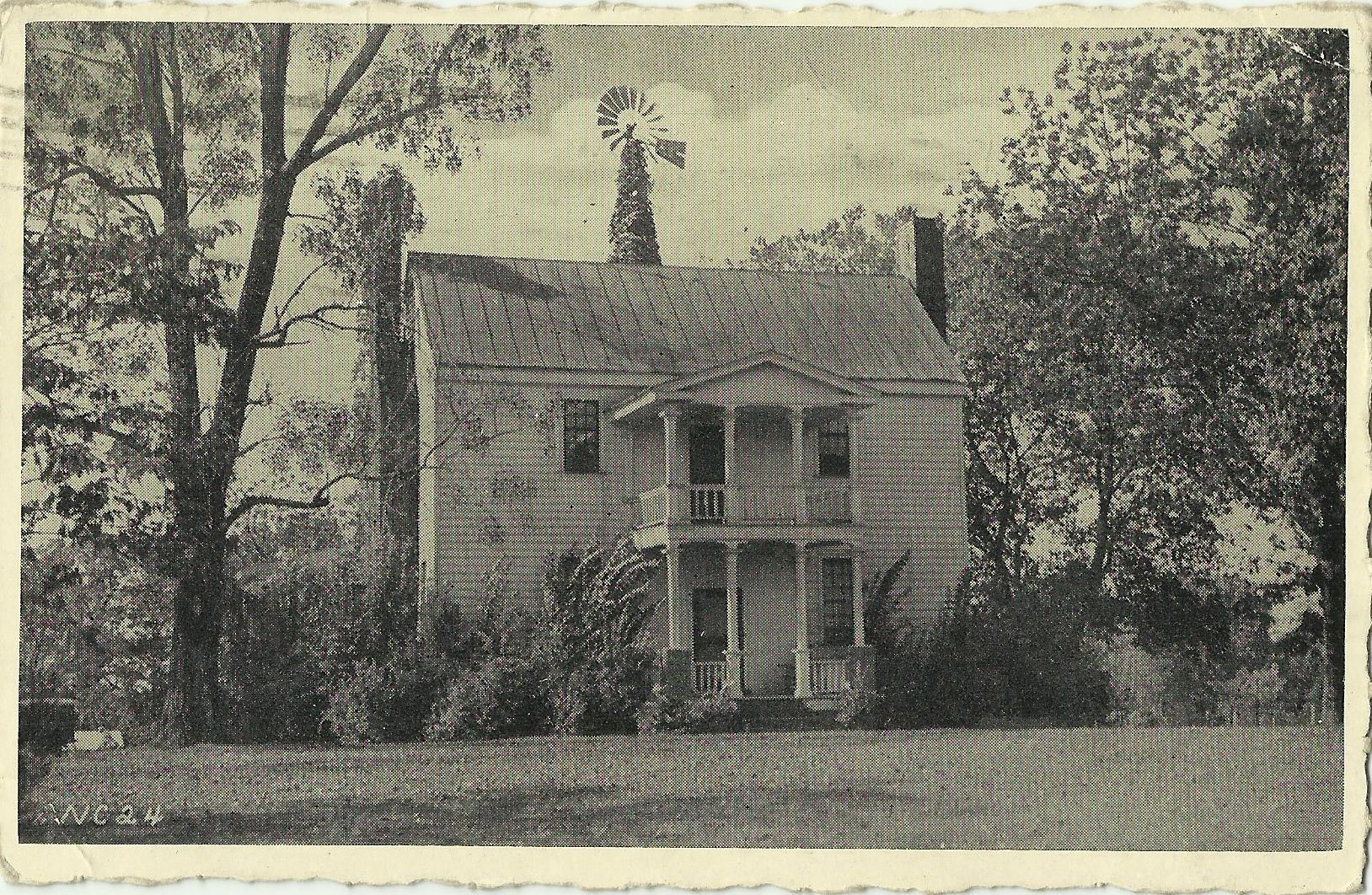
- Nancy Jones House in 1939

- Location within North Carolina Location within the United States
- Location: NC 54, Cary, North Carolina
- Coordinates: 35°47′54″N 78°48′09″W
- Area: 16 acres (6.5 ha)
- Built: c. 1803
- Architectural style: Federal, Vernacular Federal
- NRHP reference No.: 84002540
- Added to NRHP: March 1, 1984

Nancy Jones House is a historic home located near Cary, Wake County, North Carolina. It was listed on the National Register of Historic Places in 1984. It is the oldest surviving structure in Cary.

== History ==
The Nancy Jones House was built on a 2,000-acre (810 ha) plantation on Chapel Hill Road in 1803 by Nathaniel Jones, known as Nathaniel Jones of Crabtree to differentiate him from Nathaniel Jones of White Plains who lived nearby. Jones' son Henry inherited the house in 1809. Henry married Nancy Ann Jones, daughter of Nathaniel Jones of White Plains, in 1813. Henry and Nancy started a stagecoach stop and a tavern out of the home which became a landmark on the route between the capital city Raleigh and Chapel Hill, home to the University of North Carolina. Maps of the era refer to Jones Ordinary.

Henry left the running tavern and the stagecoach stop to Nancy while he tended to the farms on the property and 32 enslaved people. Nancy did not offer overnight accommodations for travelers, but did serve midday meals and brandy. One historian notes, "It was said to be the only fit place for important visitors to stop on the Raleigh–Chapel Hill route."

When Henry died in 1841, Nancy inherited the house and 434 acres (176 ha) and continued to run the tavern and stagecoach stop for another 30 years. Her five children lived nearby on land they inherited.

The house was supposedly the setting of one of North Carolina's folklore. In 1838, North Carolina's Governor Edward B. Dudley and South Carolina's Governor Pierce Mason Butler stopped at the tavern while traveling between Raleigh and Chapel Hill. As they consumed apple and peach brandy, Dudley said between rounds, "Its a damned long time between drinks". Laney, an enslaved server in the tavern, was shocked by the language and notified Nancy Jones who was "shocked by the affront to her hospitality".

Other notable people have visited the house such as President James K. Polk, traveling with Governor William Alexander Graham and former governors John Motley Morehead and John Branch, while on his way to a give a commencement speech at University of North Carolina in 1847. Polk mentioned stopping for the "noontime meal at the Jones House" in his diary.

On April 17, 1865, the day, Raleigh surrendered to Union General William T. Sherman, Major General Francis Preston Blair, Jr led the XVII Corps (Union Army) into Cary and established headquarters at the Nancy Jones House.

After the Civil War, Nancy's son Adolphus operated a school from the house. Nancy died in 1876 and left the house to Adolpus. In 1878, Adolpus moved into Cary and sold the house to S. R. Horne. Other owners of the house in the late 19th and early 20th centuries include businessman Russell O. Heater and civic and political leader Henry Adams. Audrey Mary and Thomas Robert Stone, who ran a barbeque restaurant in Cary, purchased the house and sixteen acres from Adams in 1935.

The house was documented by workers with the Federal Writers' Project during the Great Depression. During Cary's Centennial Celebration in 1971, 400 people toured the house. By 1983, the property had been annexed into the town of Cary. Audrey Stone left the property to her nieces and nephews when she died in 1991, including April Gillespie of Raleigh, North Carolina. Gillespie bought out her brothers and rented the house so that it would not be vacant.

The Friends of Page-Walker, a historic preservation organization based in Cary, began creating a preservation plan for the Nancy Jones House in 2005. The group gave presentations to increase awareness of threats to the historic structure. In 2007, the town of Cary considered an ordinance to protect the house, along with possibly purchasing the house. Although Gillespie was not actively looking to sell the property, she lacked the financial resources for its restoration.

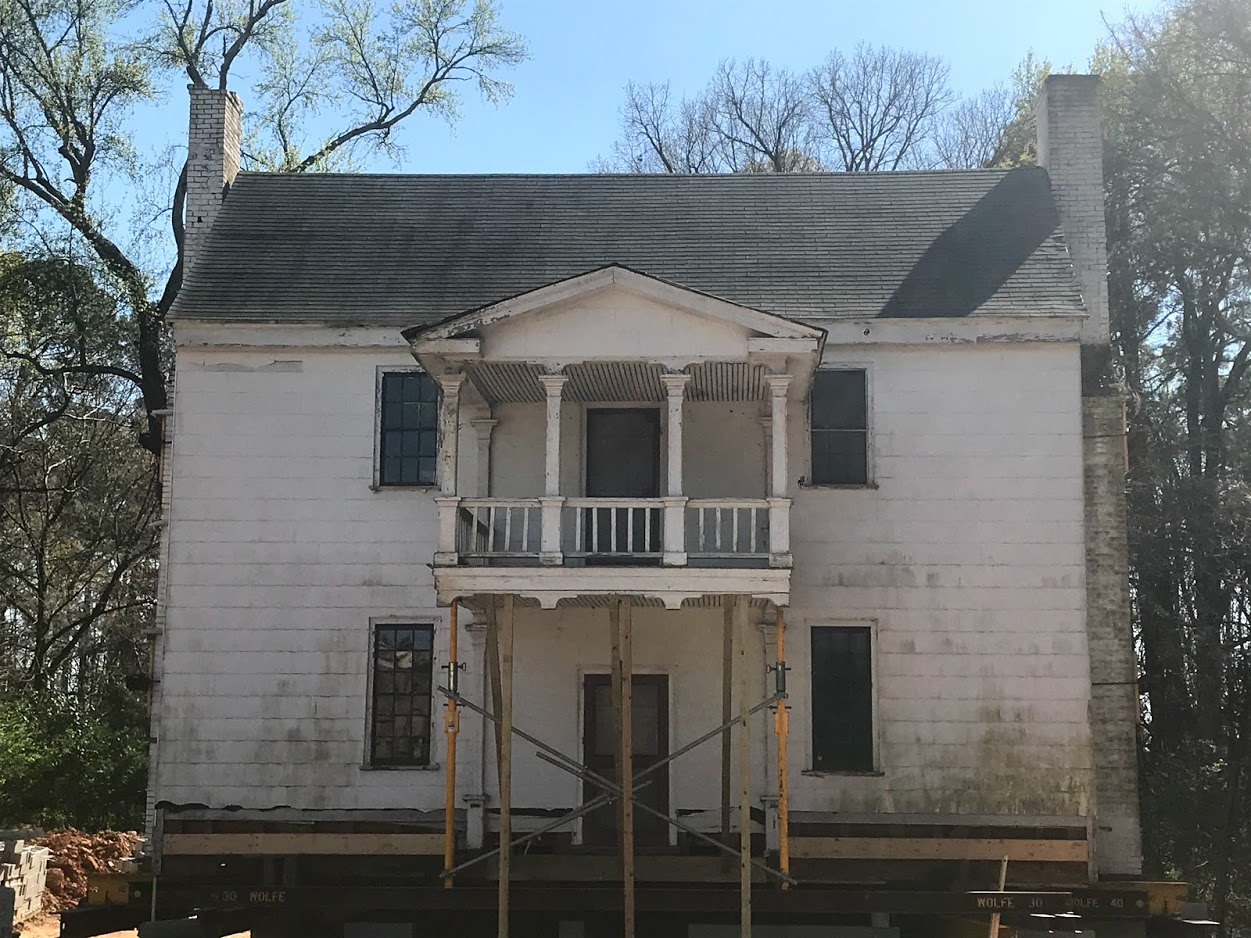
Nancy Jones House after relocation

In 2016, the adjacent Sri Venkateswara Temple of North Carolina purchased the Nancy Jones House and property for its planned expansions. In May 2019, the town of Cary announced that it was purchasing the Nancy Jones House from Sri Venkateswara Temple for $100,000 in order to ensure its preservation. However, the house had to be moved off the temple's property within a year. The sale to the town was completed on October 18, 2019.

To ensure that the house would remain on the National Register of Historic Places despite its move, the town filed paperwork with North Carolina State Historic Preservation Office which forwards reports to the National Park Service. The National Park Service approved the move on November 27, 2020, writing, "The Nancy Jones House will remain listed in the National Register during the move. Final approval of its continued listing of the house on its new site will be issued after the move"

On Saturday, March 20, 2021, the house was moved by Wolfe House & Building Movers from 9391 Chapel Hill Road to a new location, approximately 500 feet (150 m) down Chapel Hill Road. The new site is 1.17 acres (0.47 ha) which was conveyed to Cary in December 2020. It took five hours to move the house, during which time Chapel Hill Road was closed to traffic. Cary appropriated $900,000 to relocate and stabilize the Nancy Jones House. The move was documented through photos and videos by members of the Friends of Page-Walker.

== Design ==
Nancy Jones House is a two-story, single pile, Federal style frame dwelling. It sits on a brick foundation and has two exterior end chimneys. It has a hall and parlor plan and features a double front portico topped by a broken pediment gable roof. There was a windmill behind the house until it blew down in the early 1940s.

== External Sources ==
Cary Moves the Nancy Jones House (photographs)
