= Hemlock Bluffs Nature Preserve =

Protected area in North Carolina, United States

- IUCN category IV (habitat/species management area)
- Location within North Carolina Location within the United States
- Location: Wake County, North Carolina, United States
- Coordinates: 35°43′31″N 78°47′11″W
- Area: 140 acres (57 ha)
- Elevation: 413 ft (126 m)
- Established: 1976
- Named for: Eastern Hemlock
- Operator: Cary Department of Parks, Recreation and Cultural Resources
- Website: Stevens Nature Center at Hemlock Bluffs Nature Preserve | Town of Cary

Hemlock Bluffs Nature Preserve is a joint project between the North Carolina state park system and Cary, Wake County, North Carolina in the United States. Located in Cary, it covers approximately 140-acre (0.57 km^{2}) in the Research Triangle region of the state. The state owns 97-acre (0.39 km^{2}) of the preserve, known as Hemlock Bluffs State Natural Area. The Town of Cary owns approximately 42-acre (0.17 km^{2}) of the preserve, and the town leases the state's land for management. The preserve protects a population of Eastern Hemlock trees and other vegetation more typically found further west, in the Appalachian Mountains. The tall, north-facing bluffs of Swift Creek provide conditions similar enough to the mountains to have allowed the plant communities to have survived there since the last ice age.

The Stevens Nature Center is a nature center located on Cary's portion of the preserve, which provides the preserve's core visitor facilities. It provides information about the natural history of the area and the plants and animals that live in the Nature Preserve.

== Hiking Trails ==
The preserve has approximately 3 miles of mulched hiking trails featuring boardwalks, benches, stairs, and overlooks.

Hiking Trails
Name	Distance(Roundtrip)	Description
Swift Creek Loop Trail	0.8 Miles	This trail features about 100 stairs, and travels through floodplain to two overlooks.
Chestnut Oak Loop Trail	1.2 Miles	This trail winds through steep bluffs, featuring benches and one overlook.
Beech Tree Cove Trail	0.9 Miles	A spur trail from Chestnut Oak Loop Trail, featuring two overlooks and 41 stairs.
West Hemlock Overlook	0.7 Miles	A spur trail from Chestnut Oak Loop trail to an overlook of the West Bluffs, featuring 19 stairs.
