= Cary Historic District =

Historic district in North Carolina, United States

- U.S. National Register of Historic Places
- U.S. Historic district
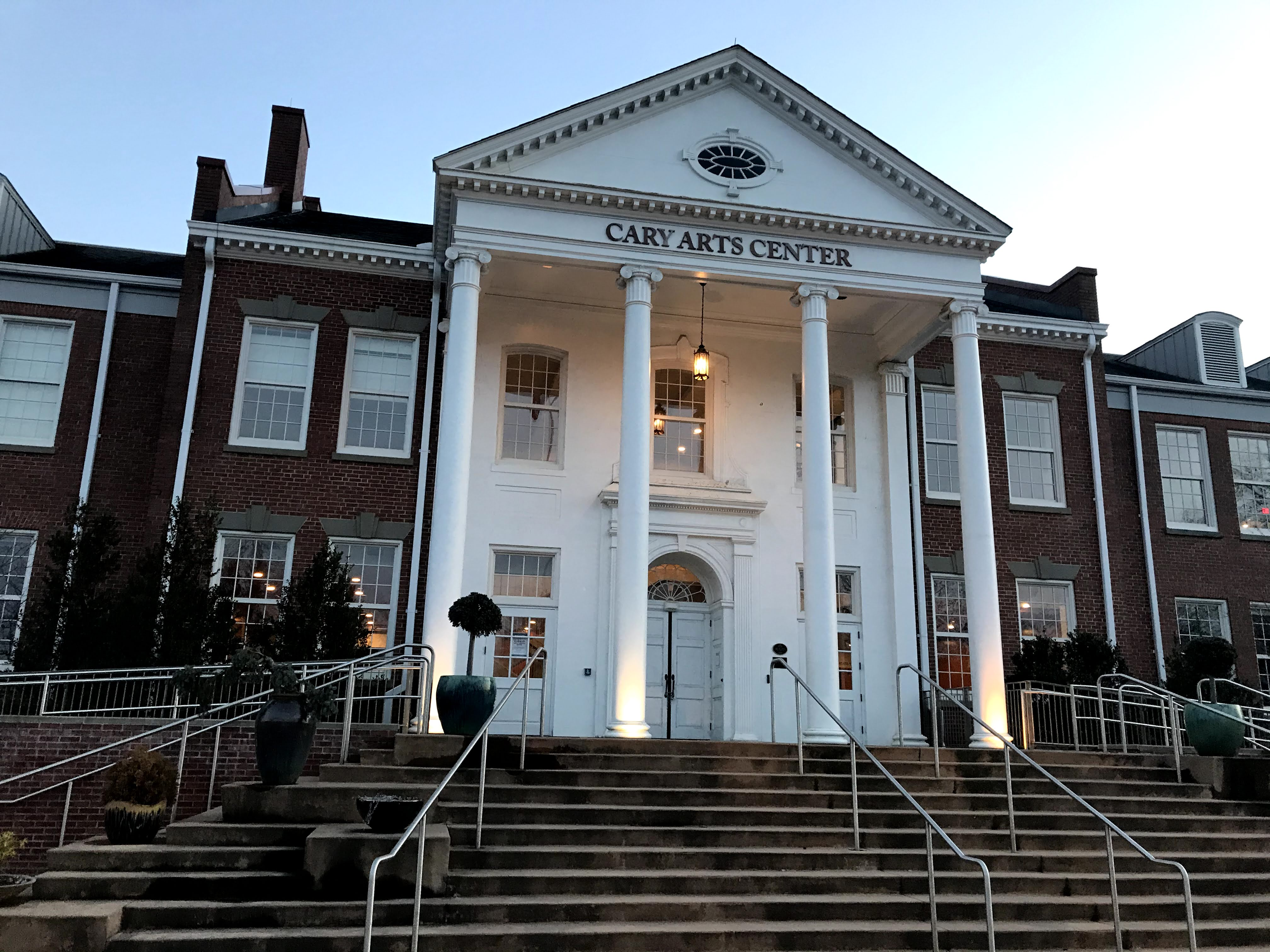
- The Cary Arts Center, originally Cary Academy, located in the center of the Historic District

- Location within North Carolina Location within the United States
- Location: Roughly along Dry Ave., S. Academy St., and Park St., Cary, North Carolina
- Coordinates: 35°47′09″N 78°46′56″W
- Area: 18 acres (7.3 ha)
- Built: c. 1907
- Architect: Works Progress Administration
- Architectural style: Classical Revival
- MPS: Wake County MPS
- NRHP reference No.: 01000425
- Added to NRHP: April 25, 2001

Cary Historic District is a national historic district located at Cary, Wake County, North Carolina. The district encompasses 39 contributing buildings in a predominantly residential section of Cary. The district developed between about 1890 and 1945, and includes notable examples of Queen Anne and Bungalow / American Craftsman style architecture. Notable buildings include the former Cary High School (Later Cary Elementary School at application, now Cary Arts Center) built in 1939 by the Works Progress Administration, Esther Ivey House (c. 1890), Captain Harrison P. Guess House (1830s, c. 1900), and Dr. John P. Hunter House (c. 1925).

It was listed on the National Register of Historic Places in 2001.
