= Carpenter Historic District (Raleigh, North Carolina) =

Historic district in North Carolina, United States

- U.S. National Register of Historic Places
- U.S. Historic district
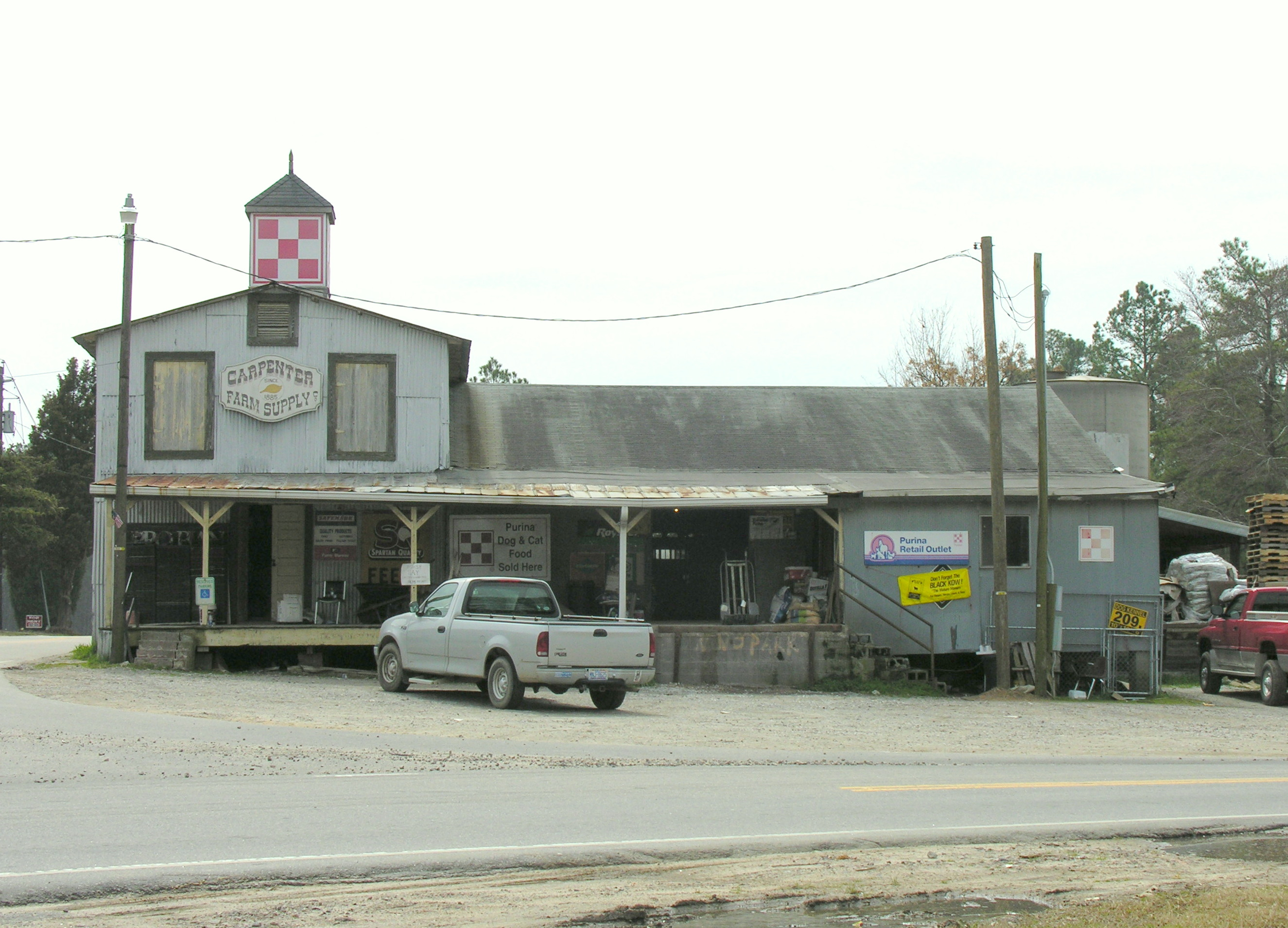
- Carpenter Historic District, March 2005

- Location within North Carolina Location within the United States
- Location: Along Morrisville–Carpenter Road, east of CSX Transportation tracks and west of Davis Drive, near Cary, North Carolina
- Coordinates: 35°49′18″N 78°51′47″W
- Area: 210 acres (85 ha)
- Built: c. 1895
- Architectural style: Late Victorian, Colonial Revival, et.al.
- MPS: Wake County MPS
- NRHP reference No.: 00000549
- Added to NRHP: May 26, 2000

Carpenter Historic District is a national historic district located near Cary, Wake County, North Carolina. The districts encompasses 66 contributing buildings, 1 contributing site, and 8 contributing structures in the rural crossroads community of Carpenter. The district developed between about 1895 and 1933, and includes notable examples of Late Victorian and Colonial Revival style architecture. Notable buildings include the Carpenter Farm Supply Company (c. 1895, 1916), D. Judson Clark Machine/Garage (c. 1920), Byrd-Ferrell House (c. 1900), Mallie and Cora Butts Farm, A.M. Howard Farm, and Barbee-Williams Farm.

It was listed on the National Register of Historic Places in 2000.
