= Eliza Jane Pratt =

American politician (1902–1981)

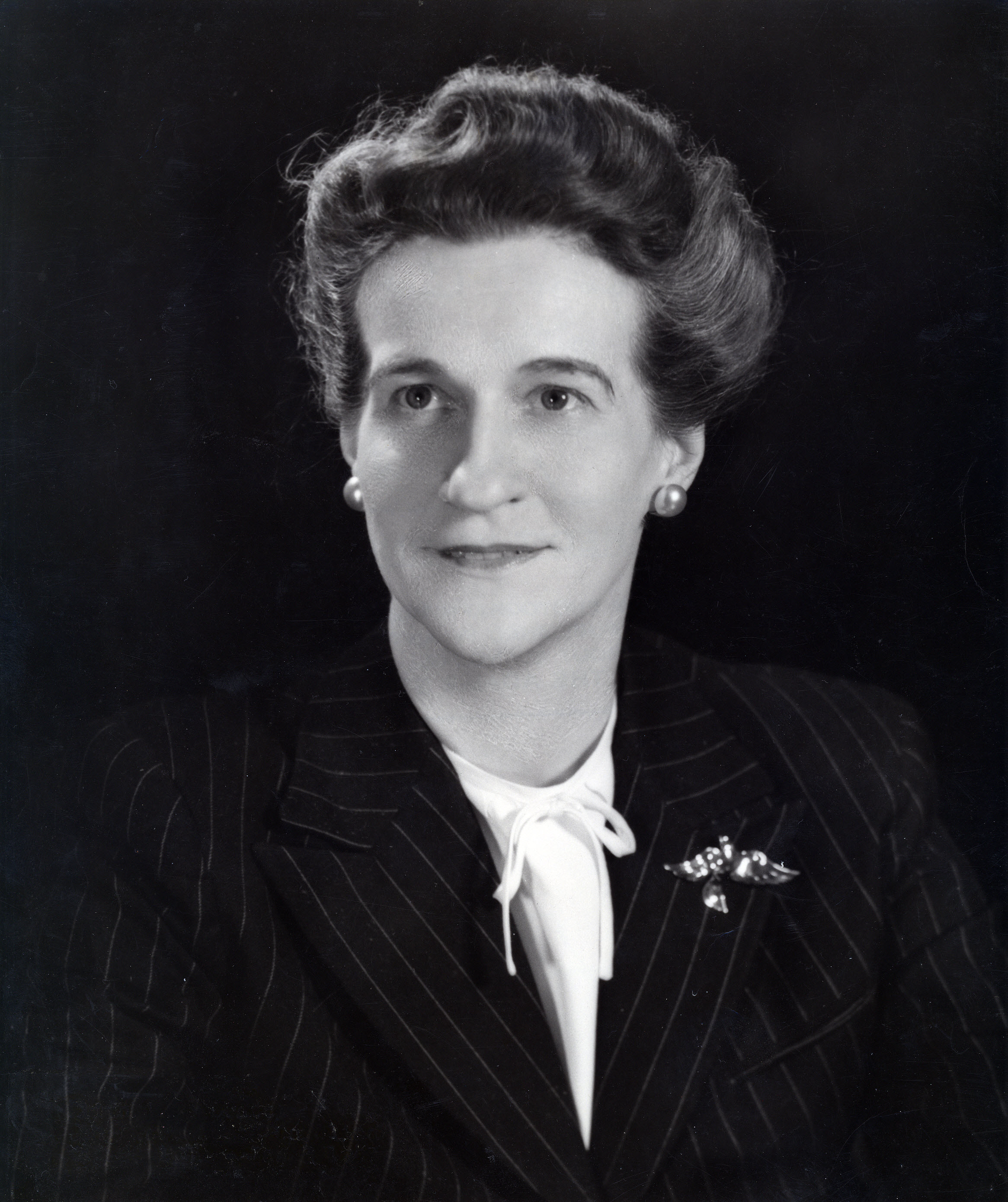

Member of the U.S. House of Representatives from North Carolina's 8th district
- In office May 25, 1946 – January 3, 1947
- Preceded by: William O. Burgin
- Succeeded by: Charles B. Deane

Personal details
- Born: March 5, 1902 Anson County, North Carolina
- Died: May 13, 1981 (aged 79) Charlotte, North Carolina
- Party: Democratic
- Education: Queens College

Eliza Jane Pratt (March 5, 1902 – May 13, 1981) was a United States representative from North Carolina, the first woman to represent her state in the U.S. Congress.

She was the only woman elected to the House of Representatives from North Carolina until the 1992 election of Eva Clayton.

== Early life and education ==
Pratt was born in Anson County, North Carolina on March 5, 1902. She attended Queens College in Charlotte, North Carolina from 1918 to 1920.

== Career ==
In 1923, Pratt worked as an editor for the Montgomerian newspaper in Troy, North Carolina. In 1924, she was hired as an administrative assistant for Congressman William C. Hammer. Following Hammer's death in 1930, Pratt worked for a succession of North Carolina representatives: Hinton James, J. Walter Lambeth and William O. Burgin.

When Burgin died in office in 1946, Pratt was elected as a Democrat to fill the vacancy. She served from May 25, 1946, to January 3, 1947, and was not a candidate in the 1946 general election. During her time in office, Pratt was appointed to three committees: Pensions, Territories, and Flood Control.

Pratt went on to a variety of federal government jobs between 1947 and 1956 with the Office of Alien Property, the Agriculture Department, and the Library of Congress. She worked as secretary for another member of Congress, Alvin Paul Kitchin, from 1957 through 1962. In 1962, Pratt returned to North Carolina and worked as a public relations executive for the North Carolina Telephone Company.

== See also ==
- Women in the United States House of Representatives

U.S. House of Representatives
Preceded by William O. Burgin	Member of the U.S. House of Representatives from North Carolina's 8th congressional district 1946–1947	Succeeded by Charles B. Deane
