= Frank Page =

Frank Page may refer to:

- Frank Page (Southern Baptist), former CEO of the Southern Baptist Convention
- Frank Page (broadcaster) (1925–2013), radio broadcaster at KWKH in Shreveport, Louisiana
- Frank Page (motoring journalist) (1930–2014), British motoring journalist
- Frank Page (politician) (1824 – 1899), mayor and founder of Cary, North Carolina
- Frank Page (industrialist) (1875 – 1934), father of the North Carolina highway system

== See also ==
- Francis Page (disambiguation)
