= Frank Page (industrialist) =

American industrialist (1875–1934)

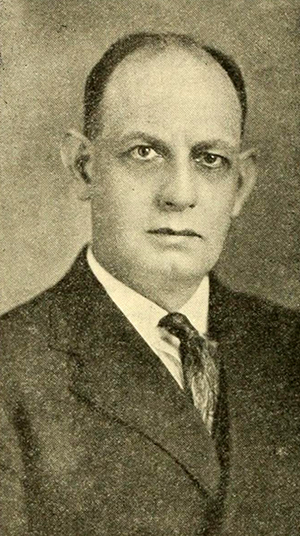
- Page in 1922
- Born: February 22, 1875; Cary, North Carolina, US
- Died: December 20, 1934 (aged 59); Raleigh, North Carolina, US
- Resting place: Old Bethesda Cemetery
- Education: University of North Carolina at Chapel Hill
- Spouse: Ella Barringer Martin (m. 1896)
- Children: 3

Frank Page (February 22, 1875 – December 20, 1934) was an American industrialist and banker. He is considered the father of the North Carolina Highway System.

== Early life and education ==
Frank Page was born in Cary, North Carolina, on February 22, 1875. His parents were Allison Francis Page, Cary's founder, and Catherine Raboteau. Allison Francis developed railroads and lumber industry throughout North Carolina. Frank was the youngest of five sons, including Walter Hines Page and Robert N. Page. The Page family relocated to Aberdeen, North Carolina, when Frank was six years old. He completed his preparatory education at Davis Military School. He attended University of North Carolina at Chapel Hill from 1894 to 1895 and was a member of the Alpha Tau Omega fraternity.

He subsequently worked at his father's businesses, serving as manager of the Page Lumber Company, general manager of the Aberdeen and Asheboro Railroad, and vice president of the Page Trust Company. He and his brothers are considered founders of Biscoe, North Carolina. On June 17, 1896, Page married Ella Barringer Martin. They had three children, including Allison Martin Page, Clara Martin Page, and Frank Martin Page. Page was a Methodist.

== World War I ==
During World War I, Page enlisted in the United States Army Corps of Engineers, where he attained the rank of lieutenant but was acting major. He refused a promotion to colonel so that he could go overseas to France, where he oversaw the construction of roads. Page was put in charge of a regiment with a reputation for being "incorrigibles" and successfully rehabilitated them into a loyal force. He was relieved of his command in January 1919. His son Allison Martin Page also enlisted as a private and was promoted to sergeant during the Battle of Belleau Wood in June 1918. Allison died in the battle on June 25, 1918, and was awarded five citations for his actions.

== State Highway Commission ==
In April 1919, North Carolina governor Thomas Walter Bickett appointed Page commissioner of the new State Highway Commission. The North Carolina Assembly originally appropriated $50 million to finance the construction of a state highway system, although the actual cost of the project was eventually doubled. In 1921, Page offered his resignation from the position but then-Governor Cameron A. Morrison refused to accept it.

In 1921, the state legislature tasked Page with building 5,000 miles of hard surface road across the state. During his tenure, he oversaw what was, at the time, the state's largest spending on a single project in history. He is considered the father of the modern highway system in North Carolina. Page was also president of the American Road Builders Association until 1924. Herbert Hoover also appointed Page to the National Highway Safety Council.

He was awarded a Doctor of Law degree from the University of North Carolina at Chapel Hill in 1923. He was a delegate from the United States to the Pan-American Road Congress in Buenos Aires in 1925. Page was reappointed by Governor Angus Wilton McLean for another six-year term as commissioner of the State Highway Commission in 1927. He ultimately served until 1929, having spent a total of ten years in the position. In December 1928, Page was appointed vice president of the Wachovia Bank & Trust Company of Winston-Salem. He was also serving as vice president of Page Bank & Trust Company in Aberdeen at the time.

== Death and legacy ==
Page died in Raleigh, North Carolina, on December 20, 1934. He was buried at the Old Bethesda Cemetery in Aberdeen. A bronze plaque commemorating him is at the entrance of the Highway Building in Raleigh.
