= Arthur Page =

Arthur Page may refer to:

- Arthur W. Page (1883–1960), VP & Director of AT&T, 1927–47
- Sir Arthur Page (judge) (1876–1958), British barrister and judge
- Sir Arthur John Page (1919–2008), British Conservative politician
