= Edgar Allan Forbes =

American International reporter in early 20th century

Edgar Allan Forbes (September 25, 1872 – May 24, 1936) was an American reporter and author in the early 20th century. Born in Gainesville, Georgia, he traveled widely. He lauded American missionary physicians in an editorial. He wrote for The World's Work and traveled to Africa to write and take photographs for newspaper dispatches. While there he also wrote a book titled White Man's Africa. He also reported for the AP in Liberia.

In 1910, he was scheduled to give a talk on Black Man's Africa to the Booksellers Guild.

In 1913, he was managing editor for Frank Leslie's Illustrated Newspaper. His photographic work included an image of funeral pyres on the Ganges River in India and of the remote mountain town of Adjuntas, Puerto Rico.

He also wrote the books The Land of the White Helmet and Twice Around the World.

He was the publisher of the Placer Gold newspaper. He died at his home in Loomis, California, in 1936.
