= Francis Page =

Francis Page may refer to:

- Francis Page (martyr), Roman Catholic priest executed at the same time as Thomas Tichborne
- Francis Page (judge) (1661–1741), MP for Huntingdon and a Justice of the Court of Common Pleas and King's Bench
- Francis Page (died 1803) (c. 1726–1803), MP for Oxford University

== See also ==
- Frank Page (disambiguation)
