= Frank Page (politician) =

American builder and politician (1824–1899)

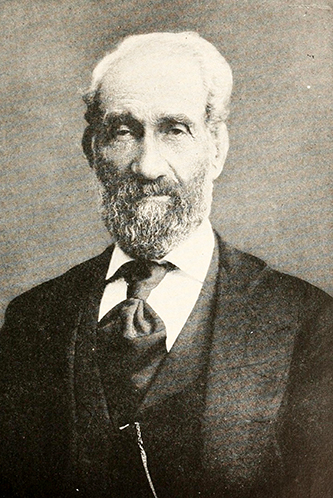
- Born: Allison Francis Page; August 30, 1824; Wake County, North Carolina, US
- Died: October 16, 1899 (aged 75); Raleigh, North Carolina, US
- Burial place: Old Bethesda Cemetery
- Spouse: Catherine "Kate" Raboteau Samuel (m. 1849; died 1897) Lula Brookshire McLeod (m. 1898)
- Children: 8, including Walter Hines Page, Robert N. Page and Frank Page

Allison Francis Page (August 30, 1824 – October 16, 1899) was an American builder and politician who was the founder and first mayor of Cary, North Carolina. He was a successful builder and sawmiller who erected buildings and railroads through the state, including at its capital Raleigh. He also founded the town of Aberdeen in Moore County.

== Biography ==
=== Early life and family ===
Page was born on August 30, 1824, as one of ten children born to Anderson Page and Mary Hayes. His birthplace was the Oaky Mount tobacco plantation in Wake County, North Carolina, near Raleigh. His great-grandfather, Edward Page, had moved to North Carolina in association with the Lewis and Clark Expedition. They were descendants of English settler John Page who migrated to Virginia.

Page was 6 feet 5 inches (1.96 metres) tall, and was of "tremendous strength". His grandson Robert Page III later commented that he had a fierce, bearded appearance. He was a strict Methodist, who opposed gambling, dancing, theatres, and profanity. He was also a staunch alcohol prohibitionist. Page was a member of the abolitionist Whig Party.

=== Timber business ===
Many of Page's siblings graduated from college, but he chose to build a logging business. He harvested timber and naval stores from the forests of North Carolina and shipped them down the Cape Fear River to Fayetteville and Wilmington. Page built a sprawling lumber business in Moore County and was known as "the Lumber King".

Page married Catherine "Kate" Raboteau Samuel on July 5, 1849. She was of Huguenot descent. They had eight children together, including Walter Hines Page, Robert N. Page, and Frank Page.

=== Founding Cary ===
In 1854, he purchased 300 acres (120 ha) of wooded land near Bradford's Ordinary, a settlement dating back to the mid-18th century. The land had good wood resources and was near a new railroad junction. He built a dry goods store by the railroad tracks. In 1856, the year that the railroad began operating, he also opened a post office and served as its first postmaster. He also built water-powered and steam-powered sawmills.

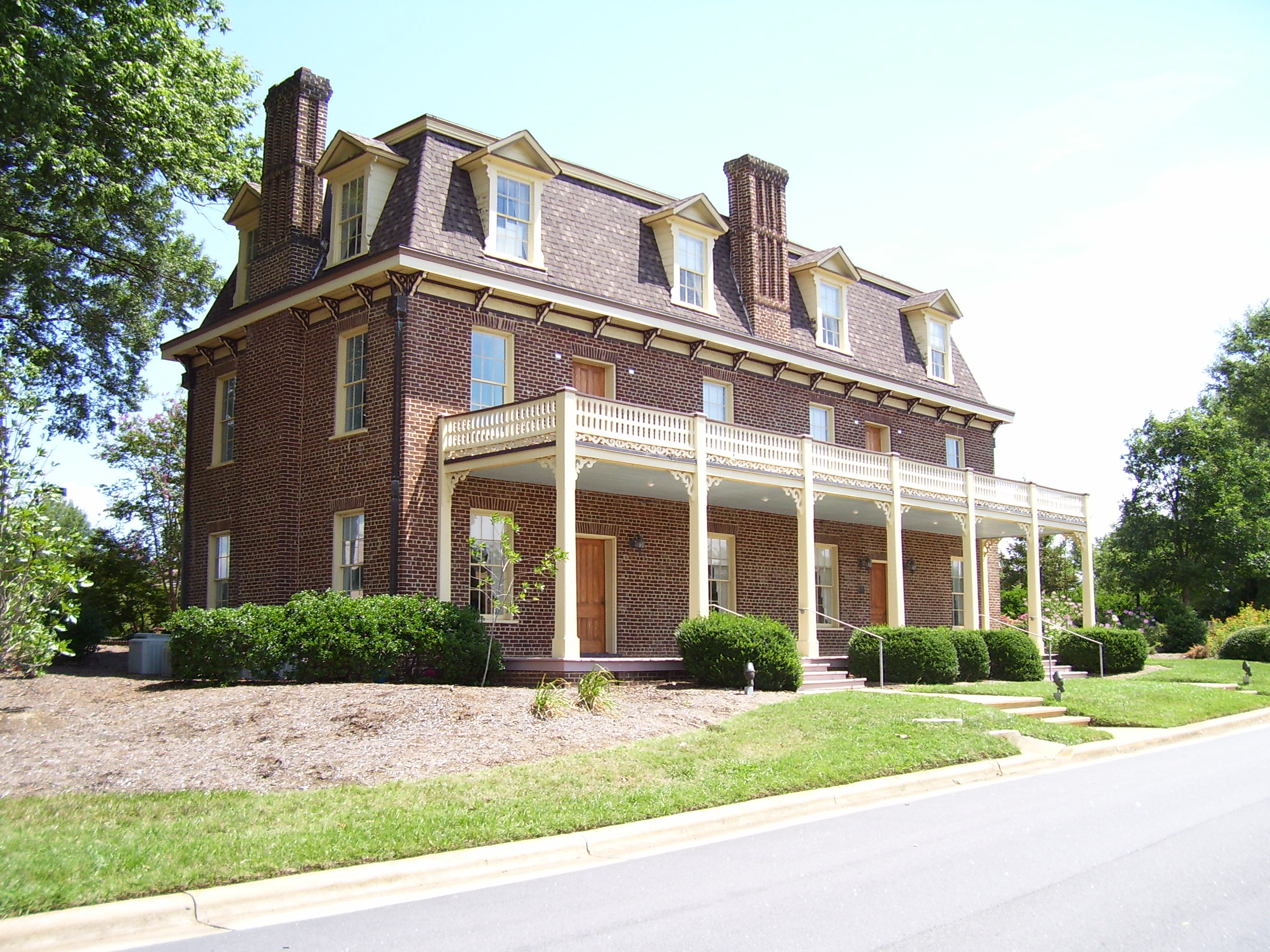
The Page-Walker Hotel in Cary

Page was bankrupt after the Confederate States of America lost the American Civil War, and its money became worthless. By the time he was in his fifties, he had accumulated $10,000 in debt. His fortunes turned around after he was elected to the North Carolina General Assembly, and the value of land in Cary began to rise. He built other businesses in the area, including a sash and blind factory and an unsuccessful cotton plant. He was planning to start a tobacco company and built a three-story brick tobacco factory, but the Panic of 1873 prevented it from opening.

In 1868, he built the Page-Walker Hotel, which served rail passengers. It was built in the Second French Empire architectural style. He laid out the town's central district in 1869, had the town incorporated in 1871, and served as its first mayor. The citizens of the town originally planned to name it Page's Station in honor of its founder. Page, who was a prohibitionist, decided instead to name it after temperance movement leader Samuel Fenton Cary. He also wrote a prohibition on alcohol into the town's charter, and the sale of alcohol was banned there until 1964.

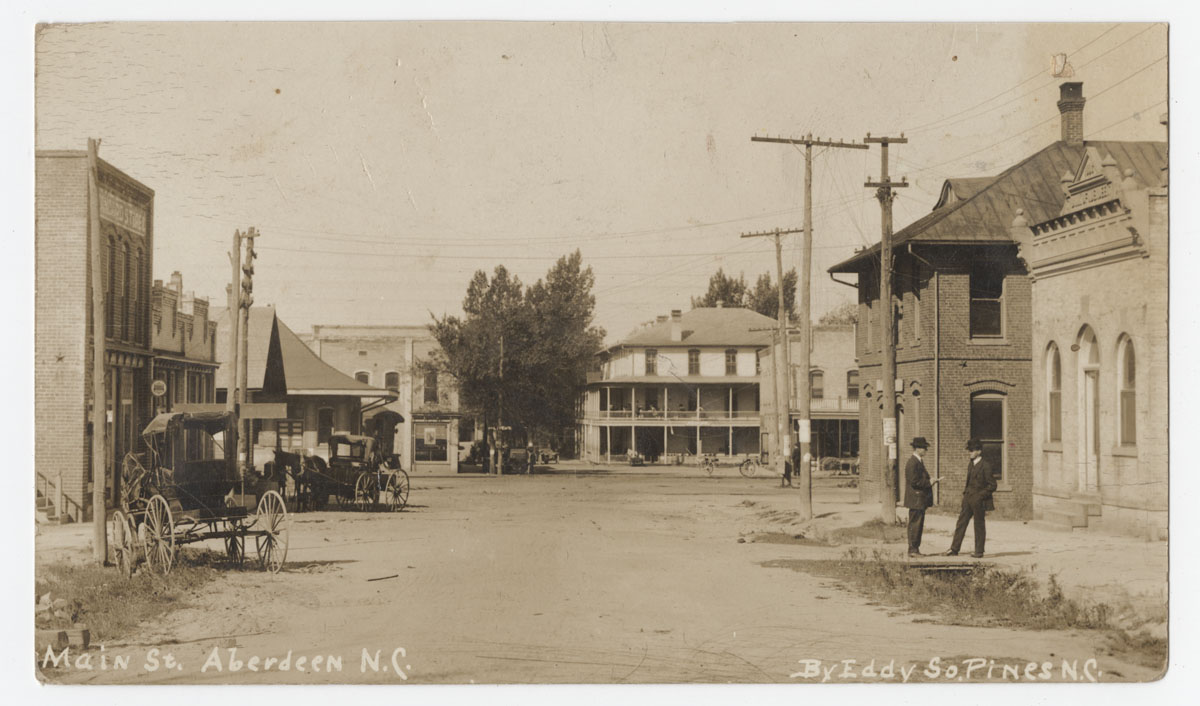
Aberdeen Main Street, between 1910 and 1918

=== Founding Aberdeen ===
Page bought more than 14,000 acres of pine forest in Moore County during the 1870s. He founded the town of Aberdeen, building two railroads (including the Aberdeen and Asheboro Railroad) and several sawmills there. He and his family moved to Aberdeen in 1881. The town was incorporated in 1889.

=== Later life in Raleigh ===
In 1893, he moved to Raleigh where he was director of Caraleigh Mills and founder of the Commercial and Farmers Bank. He donated thousands of dollars to philanthropic causes, and built many projects in the capital, including an opera house and the Academy of Music. He built the Mansion Park Hotel so that the city would have a hotel without a saloon. He also founded the Methodist Home for Children in Raleigh and numerous churches.

His first wife Catherine died on August 21, 1897. After her death, Page became more socially active, riding fast horses and introducing himself to women. Fifteen months later, he married Lula Brookshire McLeod, who was 37 years old. Lula was known for being "plain" and a strict Presbyterian who opposed alcohol and card-playing. His children objected to the marriage and suggested in their personal letters that they believed she was marrying him for his money. In 1899, Lula bought the Merrimon-Wynne House from Margaret Merrimon, widow of Augustus Summerfield Merrimon.

Page died in Raleigh on October 16, 1899. The cause of his death was documented as stomach issues, although local historian Katherine Loftlin has suggested that his wife Lula may have murdered him. His will left instructions for him to be buried at the Historic Oakwood Cemetery in Raleigh under the direction of Lula. However, his sons stole his body from her and buried him next to his first wife, Catherine in Old Bethesda Cemetery near Aberdeen. Lula held a mock funeral at Oakwood Cemetery with an empty casket. Three years later, Lula married James Stanhope Wynne, mayor of Raleigh. They deeded the Merrimon-Wynne House to Peace College in 1919, and it was known as the Lula B. Wynne Hall.
