= Page-Walker Hotel =

Historic house in North Carolina, United States

- U.S. National Register of Historic Places
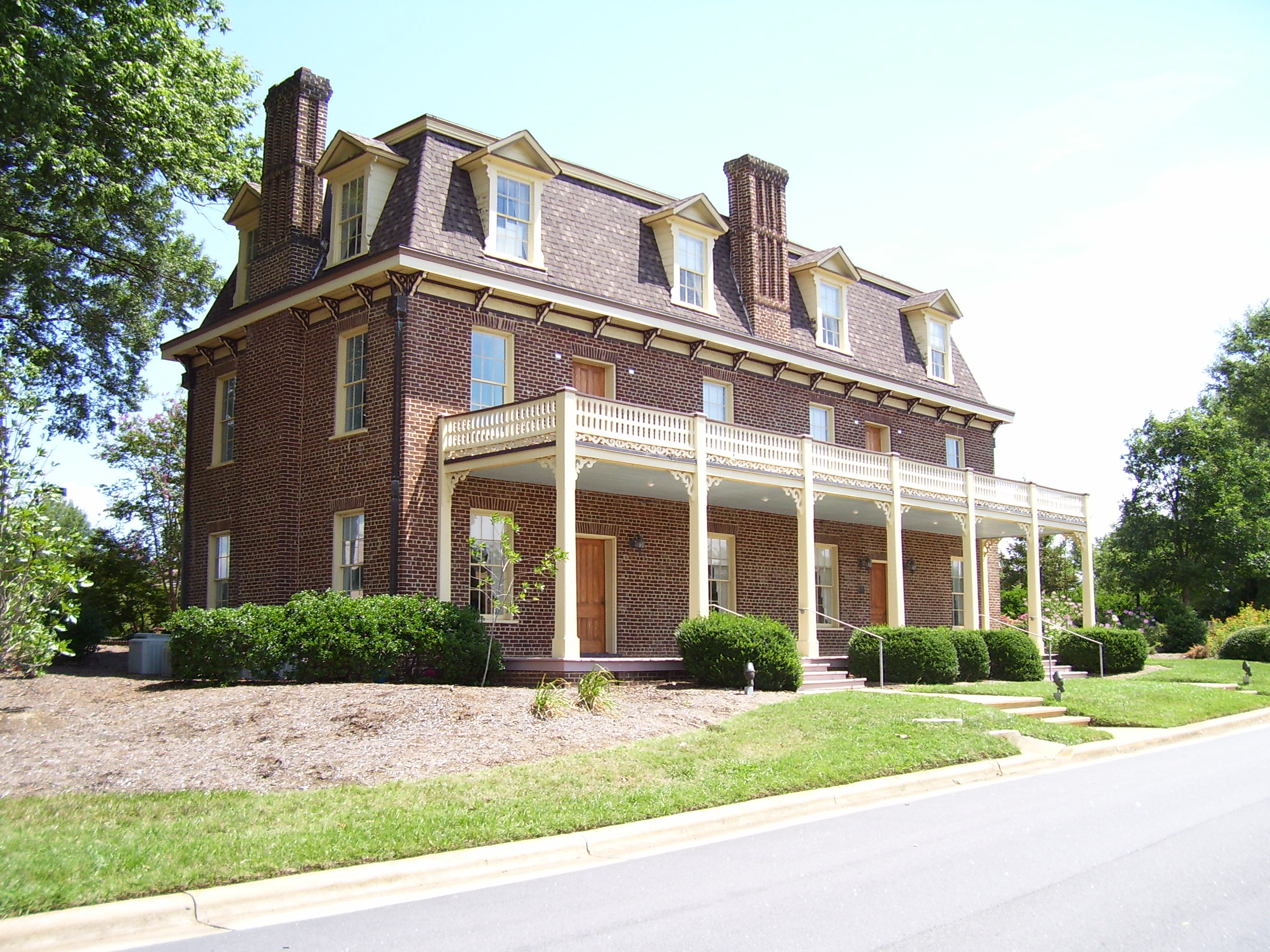
- The Page-Walker Hotel

- Location within North Carolina Location within the United States
- Location: 119 Ambassador St., Cary, North Carolina
- Coordinates: 35°47′19″N 78°46′46″W
- Area: 3 acres (1.2 ha)
- Built: c. 1868
- Architect: Allison Francis Page
- Architectural style: Second Empire
- NRHP reference No.: 79003339
- Added to NRHP: May 29, 1979

The Page-Walker Hotel, also known as the Page-Walker Arts & History Center, is a historic house museum and former hotel located in Cary, North Carolina. The founder of the town of Cary, Allison Francis Page, built the Second Empire style hotel about 1868, and J. R. Walker bought it later. Page's son Walter Hines Page (1855–1918) was an American journalist, publisher, and diplomat.

== History ==
From 1868 until 1916, passengers from the Southern and Seaboard Air Line railroads stayed at the Page-Walker Hotel. The building served as a boarding house and private residence from 1916 until 1980. After the business closed, the building sat vacant and deteriorated for five years until the Cary Town Council purchased the property. Volunteers restored the exterior of the hotel to its original design.

== Museum ==
The Arts & History Center also contains the Cary Heritage Museum, gallery exhibitions, educational rooms, an archive gallery, a smokehouse, and a garden. The Page-Walker Hotel was added to the National Register of Historic Places on May 29, 1979.

== Events Today ==
The Page-Walker currently hosts a variety of events such as weddings. Annually, they host a "Paint the Page" art contest in which young artists from grades 8-12 are invited to draw an aspect of the building that inspires them most.

== See also ==
- List of museums in North Carolina
- National Register of Historic Places listings in Wake County, North Carolina
