= Star Historic District =

Historic district in North Carolina, United States

- U.S. National Register of Historic Places
- U.S. Historic district
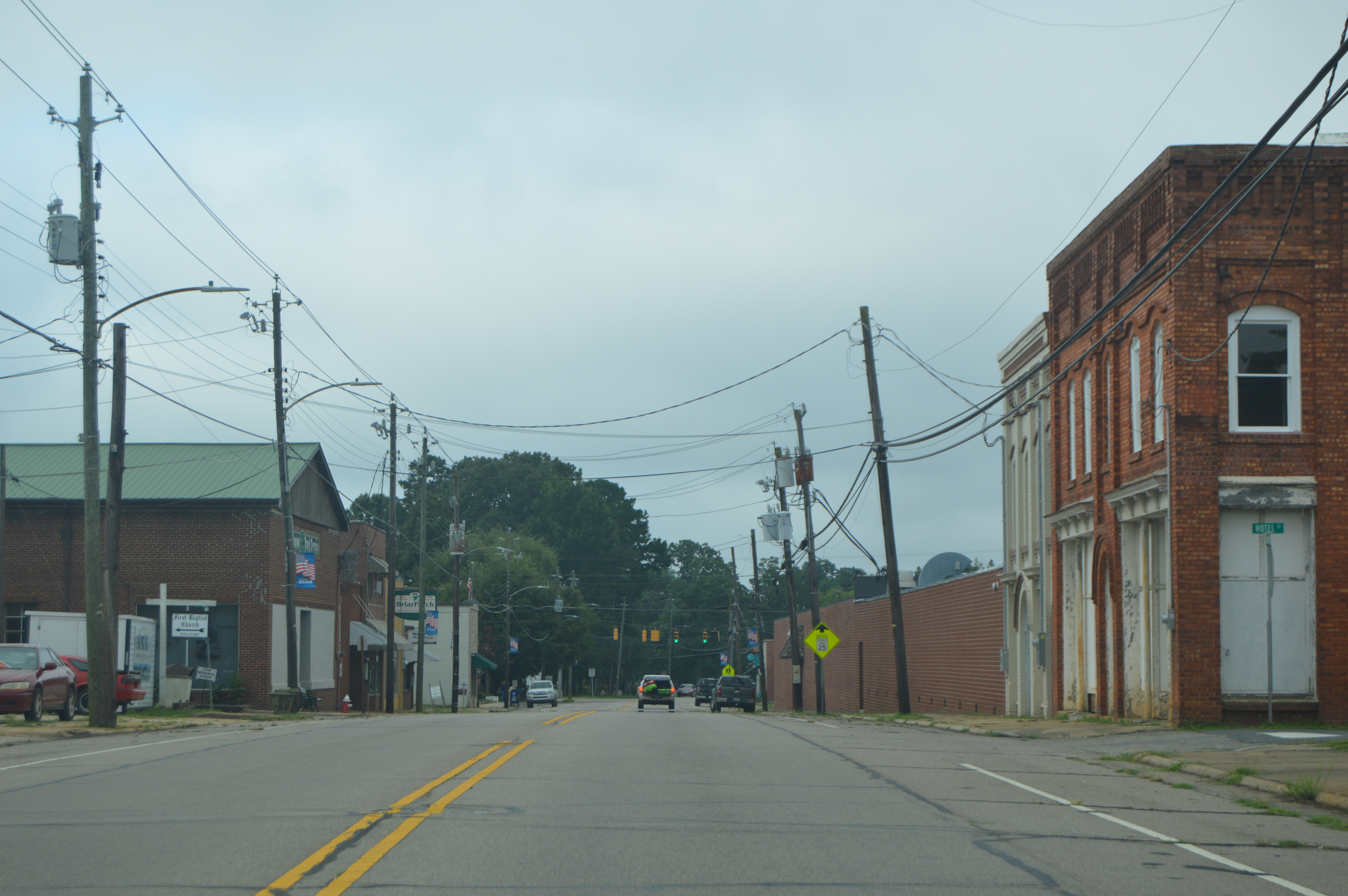
- Main Street south of Hotel Street

- Location within North Carolina Location within the United States
- Location: Roughly bounded by College, 1st, and Dameron Sts., Star, North Carolina
- Coordinates: 35°24′13″N 79°47′04″W
- Area: 78 acres (32 ha)
- Built: 1896
- Architectural style: Queen Anne, Romanesque, Colonial Revival, Craftsman
- NRHP reference No.: 13000699
- Added to NRHP: September 9, 2013

Star Historic District is a national historic district located at Star, Montgomery County, North Carolina. The district encompasses 85 contributing buildings, 2 contributing sites, and 3 contributing structures in the town of Star. The district developed between 1896 and 1963 and includes notable examples of Queen Anne, Romanesque Revival, Colonial Revival, and American Craftsman style architecture. Notable contributing resources include the Leach-Allen House and Wright Dairy (c. 1906, c. 1926), Leach Cemetery (1859), Star Railroad Depot (c. 1920), Bank of Star (c. 1910), Star Hotel (1896), Allen Building (c. 1915), Pontiac Dealership (c. 1946), Nalls Watch Repair Building/C. V. Richardson Hosiery/Star Town Hall (c. 1938, c. 1940s, 1950s), Star Methodist Church (1924, c. 1950s), and Star Presbyterian Church (1953–1958).

It was added to the National Register of Historic Places in 2013.
