= Bethesda Presbyterian Church (Aberdeen, North Carolina) =

Historic church in North Carolina, United States

- U.S. National Register of Historic Places
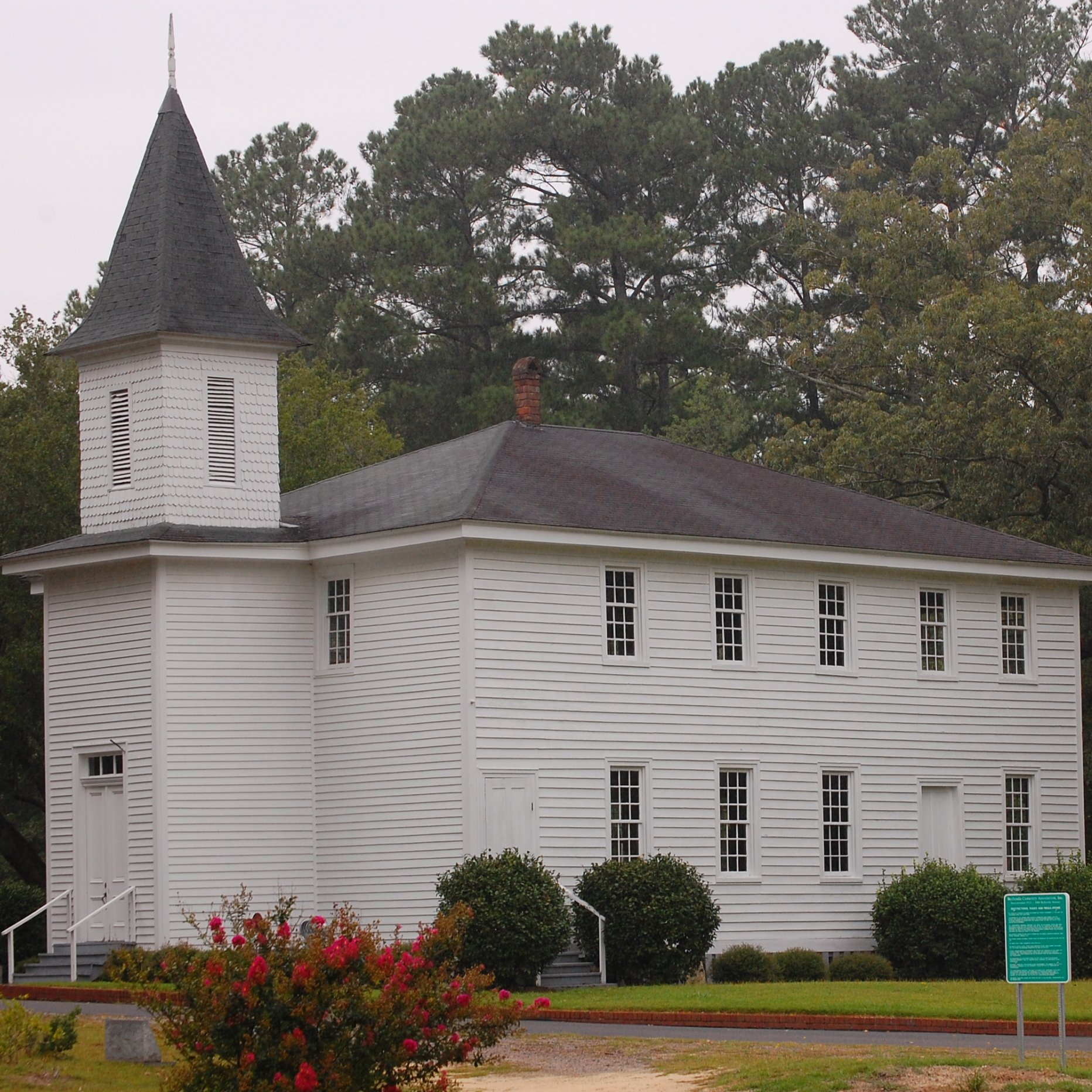
- Bethesda Presbyterian Church, September 2011

- Location within North Carolina Location within the United States
- Location: NC 5, Aberdeen, North Carolina
- Coordinates: 35°7′52″N 79°24′45″W
- Area: 22.2 acres (9.0 ha)
- Built: 1860
- Built by: McLeod, Archie; McCaskill, Norman
- NRHP reference No.: 79003345
- Added to NRHP: July 22, 1979

Bethesda Presbyterian Church is a historic Presbyterian church located on NC 5 in Aberdeen, Moore County, North Carolina.

== Architecture ==
It is a two-story, vernacular frame meeting house. It rests on tall granite piers, is sheathed in weatherboard, and has a hipped roof. The front facade features a projecting two-stage bell tower. The upper gallery of the church were originally reserved for slaves.

== History ==
A Presbyterian congregation was established in Aberdeen in 1788, founded by Highland Scots who emigrated to North Carolina. They built a church in the early 1800s but their congregation had outgrown the building by 1859. In 1860, a new church was constructed at the site. It was the third church built on those grounds and was dedicated on May 10, 1862.

During the American Civil War, General William Tecumseh Sherman's army camped on the church's grounds. The exterior sustained bullet holes during the war, which are visible today.

In 1907, the congregation moved to a larger space, a newly constructed Gothic Revival Bethesda Presbyterian Church on High Street. The original 1860 church building has since been preserved in its original condition. The Old Bethesda Cemetery Association was formed to maintain the church and its cemetery in 1927.

It was added to the National Register of Historic Places in 1979. It is now the oldest surviving church in Aberdeen. It is often used as a venue for weddings and other events.

== Cemetery ==
Also on the property is the Bethesda Cemetery which has historically been used by both the church's congregation and members of adjacent communities. Several historical figures, including Allison Francis Page, Aberdeen's founder, Walter Hines Page, Frank Page, and Robert N. Page, are buried there.
