= Leonidas D. Robinson =

American politician (1867–1941)

Member of the U.S. House of Representatives from North Carolina's 7th district
- In office March 4, 1917 – March 3, 1921
- Preceded by: Robert N. Page
- Succeeded by: William C. Hammer

Member of the North Carolina House of Representatives
- In office 1894, 1900

Mayor of Wadesboro, North Carolina
- In office 1890–1893

Personal details
- Born: Leonidas Dunlap Robinson; April 22, 1867 Gulledge Township, North Carolina, U.S.
- Died: November 7, 1941 (aged 74) Wadesboro, North Carolina, U.S.
- Resting place: Eastview Cemetery
- Party: Democratic
- Spouse(s): Nettie G Dunlap; Emma Hunter
- Parent(s): John A. Robinson; Araminta Jane Watkins
- Occupation: Politician, lawyer

Leonidas Dunlap Robinson (April 22, 1867 – November 7, 1941) was a U.S. representative from North Carolina.

Born in Gulledge Township, North Carolina, Robinson attended the common schools. He moved to Wadesboro in 1888. He studied law. He was admitted to the bar in 1889 and practiced in Wadesboro. He served as delegate to every Democratic State convention 1888-1941. He served as mayor of Wadesboro from 1890 to 1893. He served as member of the State house of representatives in 1894 and 1900. He was appointed solicitor of the thirteenth judicial district in 1901.

Robinson was elected to the same office in 1902 and served in that capacity until 1910, when he resigned. He became president of the Bank of Wadesboro in 1910. He served as delegate to the Democratic National Conventions in 1912, 1920, and 1924.

Robinson was elected as a Democrat to the Sixty-fifth and Sixty-sixth Congresses (March 4, 1917 – March 3, 1921). He declined to be a candidate for renomination. He resumed banking and also engaged in agricultural pursuits. He died in Wadesboro, North Carolina, November 7, 1941. He was interred in Eastview Cemetery.

== Sources ==
- United States Congress. "Leonidas D. Robinson (id: R000348)". Biographical Directory of the United States Congress.

U.S. House of Representatives
Preceded by Robert N. Page	Member of the U.S. House of Representatives from North Carolina's 7th congressional district 1917–1921	Succeeded by William C. Hammer
