= Arthur W. Page Center for Integrity in Public Communication =

Research centre in Pennsylvania State University

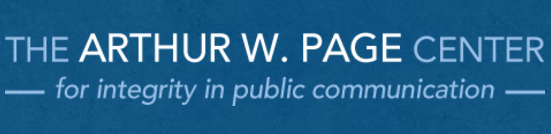

The Arthur W. Page Center for Integrity in advancement of ethics and responsibility in all forms of public communication.

== History ==
The center is named for Arthur W. Page, whose views have been distilled into the Page Principles: (1) tell the truth; (2) prove it with action; (3) listen to stakeholders; (4) manage for tomorrow; (5) conduct public relations as if the whole enterprise depends on it; (6) realize that an enterprise's true character is expressed by its people; and (7) remain calm, patient and good-humored.

The center's name was the idea of alumnus Lawrence G. Foster, who retired as corporate vice-president of public relations at Johnson & Johnson. The launch was made possible by a $300,000 gift he and his wife Ellen made to the college. Foster worked on the project with Edward M. Block, retired vice-president of public relations at AT&T, and John A. Koten, retired senior vice president of corporate communications at Ameritech. All three played leading roles in the formation of The Arthur W. Page Society, which functions as a separate entity.

== The Arthur W. Page Center Awards ==
The Page Center annually honors individuals who, over the course of their careers, have demonstrated consistent and fervent commitment to the concept of “truth well told." Three icons of the profession are recognized each February at an awards dinner held in New York City. Hundreds of professionals attend as the honorees are given a Larry Foster Award for Integrity in Public Communication, named after the center's founder. Past honorees include Ann Barkelew, Dick Martin, Alan Murray, Bill George, Gwen Ifill, John Onoda, Dean Baquet, Marilyn Laurie, John Rowe, Gene Foreman, Ginger Hardage, Thomas Kean, Anthony Fauci, Bill Heyman, Eugene Robinson, Judy Woodruff, Christiane Amanpour, Kenneth Chenault and Andy Polansky.

The 2023 Page Center Awards honorees are Mary Barra, Lester Holt and Jon Iwata.

== Research and projects ==
The Page Center seeks to foster a modern understanding and application of the Page principles and Robert Wood Johnson’s business philosophy by supporting innovative research, educational or public service projects in a variety of academic disciplines and professional fields.

=== Page/Johnson legacy scholars ===
Since its founding, the center has awarded more than $1 million to scholars and professionals throughout the world to support research that makes important contributions to knowledge, practice or public understanding of ethics and responsibility in public communication.

Annually, the center releases a call for proposals within a specific topic. Past topics include, sustainability, ethics of care, corporate social advocacy, organization listening, fake news, corporate social responsibility, stakeholder engagement, digital ethics and more.

== Ethics Training ==
The Page Center offers free, online modules that cover 15 ethics topics in public relations. The modules were created by Page Center scholars and feature lessons, case studies, videos, and quizzes. The lessons are designed to help instructors incorporate ethics into their college-level communications courses.

== Oral history collection ==
Printable transcripts, streaming video, and searchable indexed content provide history, analysis and individual comment on public relations and the media from the luminaries in the field. To date, the Center has conducted 31 interviews and has transcribed and indexed many acquired videos from the Arthur W. Page Society and other contributors.

== Page archive ==
The Page Center also has an archive for Page's previously uncollected papers and memorabilia and related research materials in the area of ethics in public communication and corporate responsibility.
