= Star, North Carolina =

- Town
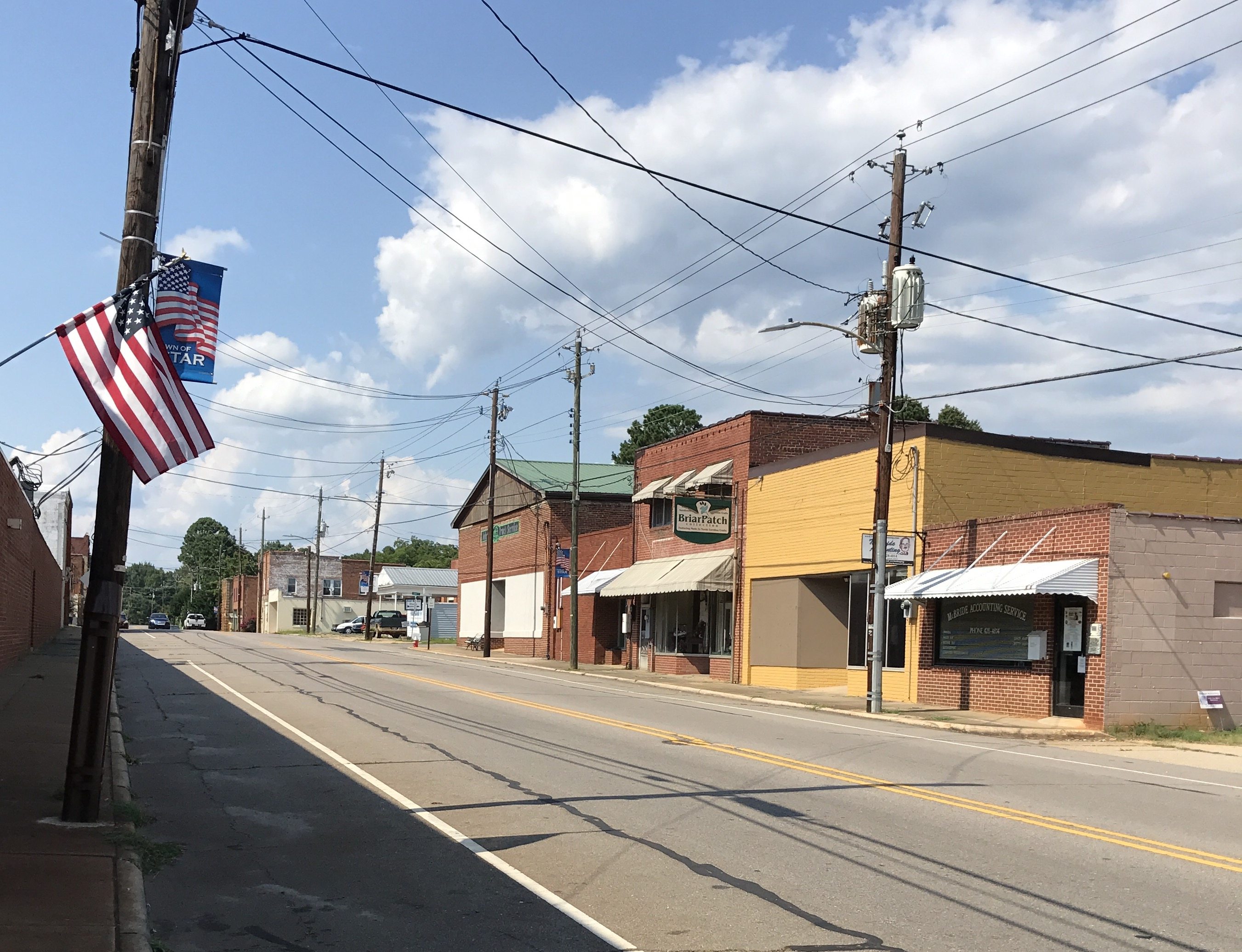
- Main Street

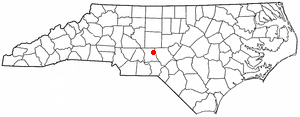
- Location in North Carolina
- Coordinates: 35°23′57″N 79°47′00″W
- Country: United States
- State: North Carolina
- County: Montgomery

Government
  - Mayor: Bill Hudson

Area
  - Total: 1.29 sq mi (3.35 km^{2})
  - Land: 1.29 sq mi (3.35 km^{2})
  - Water: 0 sq mi (0.00 km^{2})
- Elevation: 646 ft (197 m)

Population (2020)
  - Total: 806
  - Density: 623.7/sq mi (240.82/km^{2})
- Time zone: UTC-5 (Eastern (EST))
  - Summer (DST): UTC-4 (EDT)
- ZIP Code: 27356
- Area codes: 910, 472
- FIPS code: 37-64580
- GNIS feature ID: 2406660
- Website: www.starnc.gov

Star is a town in Montgomery County, North Carolina, United States. The population was 806 at the 2020 census, down from 876 in 2010.

== History ==
The Star Hotel, built by the Leach Family in 1897, is now known as The Star Hotel Bed and Breakfast Inn

The town of Star was incorporated in 1897. It was originally called "Hunsucker's Store", after a trading post operated by the original landowner, Mr. Martin Hunsucker. After the Civil War, a man named Angus Leach moved to Hunsucker's Store and helped to found the present town of Star, serving as postmaster, hotel operator, and general merchandise store owner. Gold was discovered in the area around 1866, and by 1874 there were extensive gold mining operations in this part of the state, particularly around the Little River area of Star. When the Aberdeen and West End Railroad (owned by the Page family of Aberdeen, NC), completed a branch to Star from Filo (now Biscoe, North Carolina) in 1895, it was only a short period later before Star was incorporated into a town.

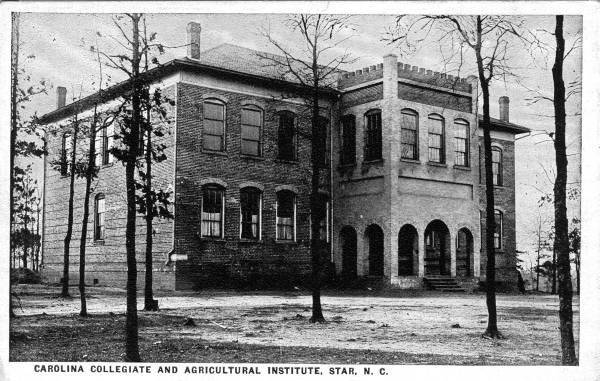
Carolina Collegiate and Agricultural Institute (Country Life Academy)

Star was a major shipping point for lumber, turpentine, and bricks beginning in 1896 with the completion of the Asheboro and Montgomery Railroad, also built by the Page family. In 1896, the Leach family erected a large wooden hotel to accommodate the travelers and workers of the railroad, and the hotel (presently the Star Hotel Bed and Breakfast) is still standing today and is owned by Gary Spivey. In 1897, the Aberdeen and West End Railroad merged with the Asheboro and Montgomery Railroad to form the Aberdeen and Asheboro Railroad, thus opening the area to a whole new range of shipping. The timber industry was the first major factor in the growth of Star. The Star Lumber Company, headed by Z.T. Wright, J.B. Shamburger, and W.T. Harper, had built a tramway in 1896 to haul logs to the mills in town. The tramway was removed in 1901 when the Durham and Charlotte Railroad was built to Star. The Durham and Charlotte Railroad was to connect the two cities of Durham and Charlotte. Because the town of Star was the junction and crossroads for the Aberdeen & Asheboro Railroad and the Durham & Charlotte Railroad, business in the town began to pick up.

Sometime around 1900, a bottling plant was established in Star by J.R. Ingrahm to bottle sodas for the area. This company preceded the Coca-Cola plant in Star, which was later moved to Biscoe. Also in 1900, the Montgomery Roller Mill was incorporated with a capital stock of $4,700 by Braxton Auman, who also operated a whiskey distillery and chair factory. In 1907, Star's first undertaker, Mr. H.D. Phillips, established a funeral parlor. This was the beginning of a long and successful business for the Phillips family, who still operate the Phillips Funeral Home today. The Carolina Collegiate and Agricultural Institute was organized in Star around 1910 by Dr. Edward F. Green. The institute cooperated with the North Carolina A&M College in Raleigh.

The town saw massive growth between the years of 1912 and 1950 when the Norfolk Southern Railway (former) purchased the old lines of the Aberdeen and Asheboro Railroad and the Durham and Charlotte Railroad. The operation held a depot, water tank, and coal chute in Star. This new era saw the introduction of the hosiery mill industry, a boom in lumber production, various new stores and products, and a huge surge in population. In 1914–1915, Boy Scout Troop 111 was established in Star, one of the earliest in North Carolina. Since that point, the town continued to slowly grow into a prosperous community. In the 1960s the town undertook the task of erecting some of the first public housing units in the state. On March 14, 1969, Lancer Inc., one of the nation's top 50 upholstered furniture manufacturers, started its operations in Star and continues to be one of Star's largest employers, having expanded its operations six times.

Since then, the hosiery mills experienced a decline and eventually left Star. This left hundreds unemployed, and the once prosperous town of Star began to wither away. The buildings that once employed many now mostly sit empty. In September 2013, downtown Star was honored by being listed on the National Register of Historic Places as the Star Historic District.

== Geography ==
Star is listed as the geographic center of North Carolina, according to the Army Corps of Engineers. A plaque marking the exact center was placed at 35°23′59″N 79°46′00″W (35.399756, -79.766613). The plaque is on private land and not open to visitors. However, conflicting reports show the geographic center actually being in Chatham County, northwest of Sanford.

Star is in northeastern Montgomery County, 3 miles (5 km) north of Biscoe and 10 miles (16 km) south of Seagrove. Troy, the Montgomery county seat, is 7 miles (11 km) to the southwest, 10 miles (16 km) by road. U.S. Route 220 Alternate passes through Star as its Main Street.

According to the U.S. Census Bureau, the town has a total area of 1.3 square miles (3.4 km^{2}), all land. The town sits on a ridge which drains west toward the Little River, a tributary of the Pee Dee River, and east toward Cotton Creek and Wolf Creek, both within the watershed of the Deep River leading to the Cape Fear River.

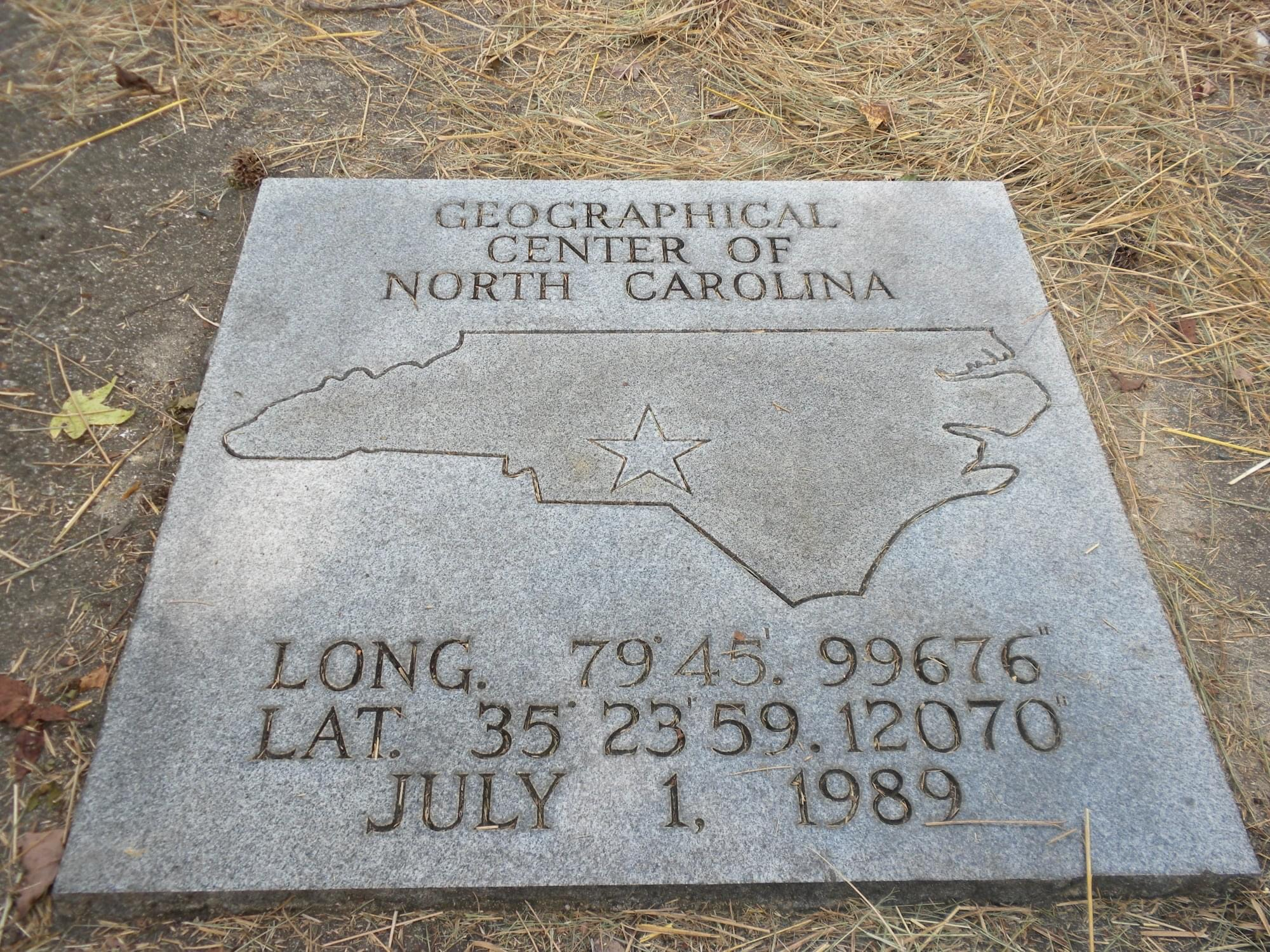
Plaque marking the geographical center of North Carolina. Photo taken July 25, 2009, by a family member of the land owner. The privately owned land is not open to the public or visitors.

== Demographics ==
Historical population
| Census | Pop. | Note | %± |
|---|---|---|---|
| 1900 | 211 | | — |
| 1910 | 239 | | 13.3% |
| 1920 | 467 | | 95.4% |
| 1930 | 634 | | 35.8% |
| 1940 | 611 | | −3.6% |
| 1950 | 677 | | 10.8% |
| 1960 | 745 | | 10.0% |
| 1970 | 892 | | 19.7% |
| 1980 | 816 | | −8.5% |
| 1990 | 775 | | −5.0% |
| 2000 | 807 | | 4.1% |
| 2010 | 876 | | 8.6% |
| 2020 | 806 | | −8.0% |
U.S. Decennial Census

=== 2020 census ===
Star racial composition
| Race | Number | Percentage |
|---|---|---|
| White (non-Hispanic) | 490 | 60.79% |
| Black or African American (non-Hispanic) | 71 | 8.81% |
| Native American | 3 | 0.37% |
| Other/Mixed | 16 | 1.99% |
| Hispanic or Latino | 226 | 28.04% |

As of the 2020 United States census, there were 806 people, 262 households, and 147 families residing in the town.

=== 2000 census ===
As of the census of 2000, there were 807 people, 335 households, and 211 families residing in the town. The population density was 666.4 people per square mile (257.3 people/km^{2}). There were 364 housing units at an average density of 300.6 per square mile (116.1/km^{2}). The racial makeup of the town was 90.71% White, 1.98% African American, 0.62% Native American, 0.12% Asian, 0.50% Pacific Islander, 5.33% from other races, and 0.74% from two or more races. Hispanic or Latino of any race were 9.17% of the population.

There were 335 households, out of which 29.0% had children under the age of 18 living with them, 43.9% were married couples living together, 14.6% had a female householder with no husband present, and 37.0% were non-families. 33.7% of all households were made up of individuals, and 14.9% had someone living alone who was 65 years of age or older. The average household size was 2.37 and the average family size was 3.04.

In the town, the population was spread out, with 25.4% under the age of 18, 10.0% from 18 to 24, 25.3% from 25 to 44, 24.3% from 45 to 64, and 15.0% who were 65 years of age or older. The median age was 36 years. For every 100 females, there were 90.8 males. For every 100 females age 18 and over, there were 87.0 males.

The median income for a household in the town was $26,845, and the median income for a family was $32,083. Males had a median income of $26,563 versus $22,344 for females. The per capita income for the town was $20,300. About 12.1% of families and 18.1% of the population were below the poverty line, including 29.8% of those under age 18 and 7.8% of those age 65 or over.

== Star today ==
Star has been designated as a U.S. Postal Service Christmas Town. The Star Christmas Parade is documented as one of the oldest in the state, as well as the longest with the most entries. Central Park NC has its current headquarters in the old Country Life Academy building in Star, now known as STARworks Center for Creative Enterprise. STARworks hosts several annual events including the Annual Glass Pumpkin Patch and FireFest: Community Fueled Art. Local and nearby attractions include Uwharrie National Forest, Badin Lake, Lake Tillery, the North Carolina Zoo, and Pinehurst.
