= William O. Burgin =

American politician

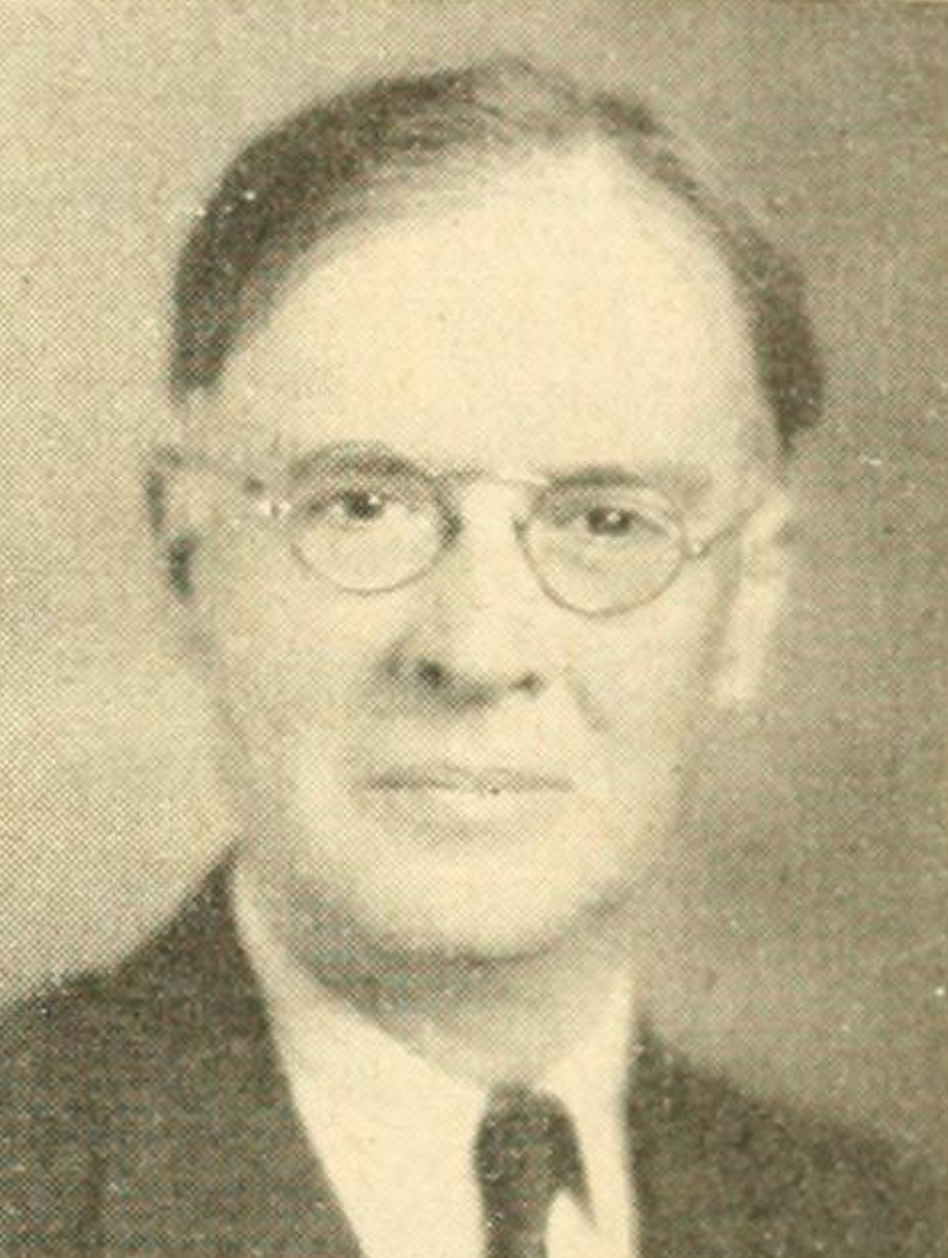

Member of the U.S. House of Representatives from North Carolina's 8th district
- In office January 3, 1939 – April 11, 1946
- Preceded by: Walter Lambeth
- Succeeded by: Eliza Pratt

Member of the North Carolina House of Representatives
- In office 1931-1933

Member of the North Carolina Senate
- In office 1933-1935

Personal details
- Born: William Olin Burgin; July 28, 1877 McDowell County, North Carolina
- Died: April 11, 1946 (aged 68) Washington, D.C.
- Party: Democratic
- Education: University of North Carolina at Chapel Hill
- Occupation: lawyer, traveling salesman and merchant

William Olin Burgin (July 28, 1877 – April 11, 1946) was a U.S. representative from North Carolina.

Born on a farm near Marion, McDowell County, North Carolina, Burgin moved with his parents to Rutherfordton, North Carolina, where he attended the public schools and Rutherfordton Military Institute. He also attended the Law School of the University of North Carolina at Chapel Hill. He engaged as a clerk in a general store in Rutherfordton in 1893 and later as a traveling salesman and merchant. He moved to Thomasville and engaged in the mercantile business. He was admitted to the bar. He served as mayor of Thomasville, North Carolina, from 1906 to 1910. He moved to Lexington, North Carolina, and continued the practice of law. He served as president and attorney of the Industrial Bank of Lexington. He served as director in a number of business enterprises in Lexington. He served in the State house of representatives in 1931. He served as member of the State senate in 1933.

Burgin was elected as a Democrat to the Seventy-sixth and to the three succeeding Congresses and served from January 3, 1939, until his death in Washington, D.C., on April 11, 1946. He was interred in Lexington Cemetery, Lexington, North Carolina.

A confidential 1943 analysis of the House Foreign Affairs Committee by Isaiah Berlin for the British Foreign Office described Burgin as "a meek, mild, homely figure who seldom makes his presence felt, but who has voted regularly for the President's foreign policy measures. A typical southern Democrat."

== See also ==
- List of members of the United States Congress who died in office (1900–1949)

== Sources ==
- United States Congress. "William O. Burgin (id: B001084)". Biographical Directory of the United States Congress.

U.S. House of Representatives
Preceded by Walter Lambeth	Member of the U.S. House of Representatives from North Carolina's 8th congressional district 1939–1946	Succeeded by Eliza Pratt
