= Walter Hines Page =

American journalist, publisher, and diplomat (1855–1918)

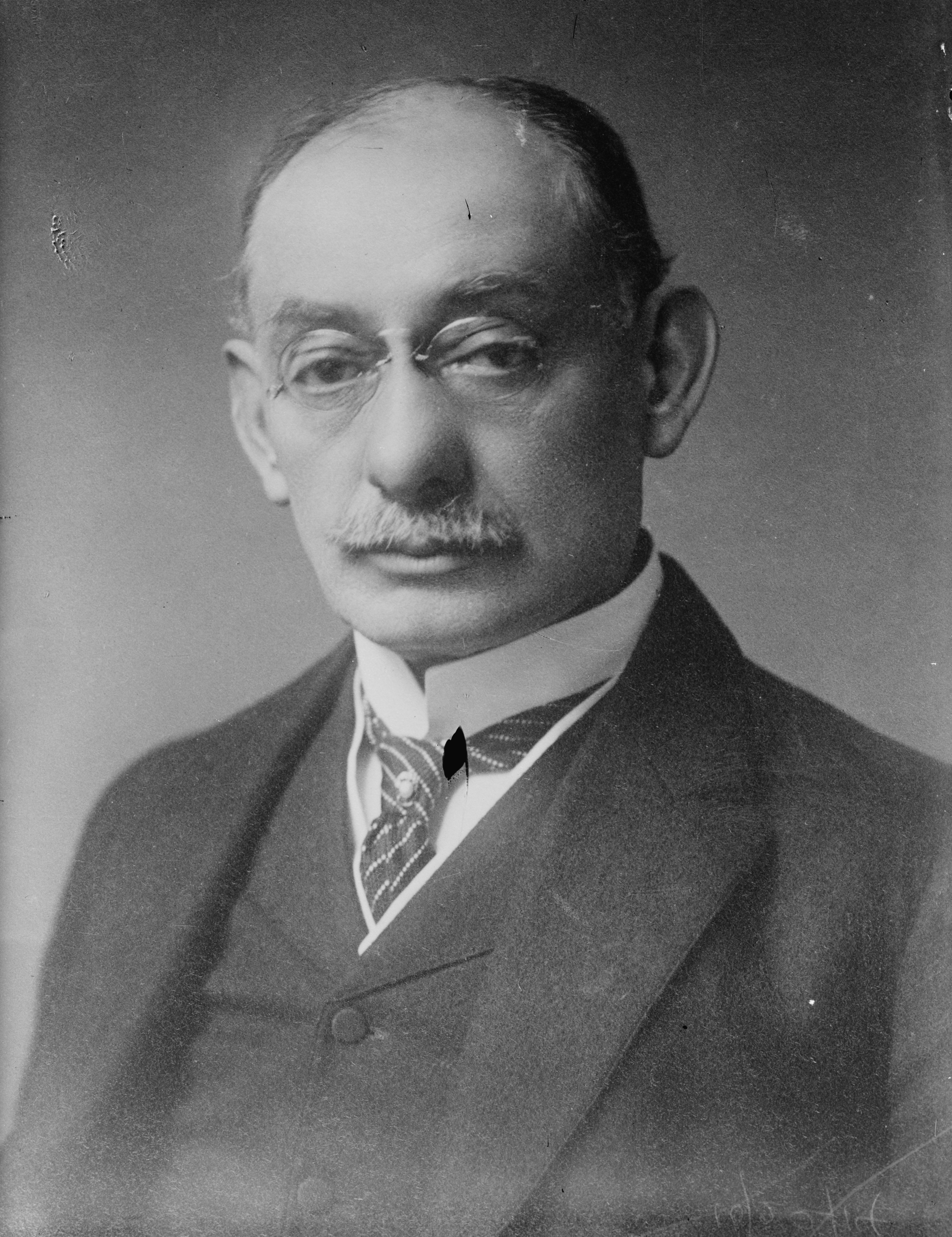
- Page in 1917

United States Ambassador to the United Kingdom
- In office May 30, 1913 – October 3, 1918
- President: Woodrow Wilson
- Preceded by: Whitelaw Reid
- Succeeded by: John W. Davis

Personal details
- Born: August 15, 1855 Cary, North Carolina, U.S.
- Died: December 21, 1918 (aged 63) Pinehurst, North Carolina, U.S.
- Party: Democratic
- Spouse: Willa Alice Wilson (m. 1880)
- Children: 4, including Arthur
- Parent: Frank Page
- Relatives: Robert N. Page (brother), Frank Page (brother), Logan Waller Page (cousin)
- Education: Duke University; Randolph-Macon College (BA); Johns Hopkins University

Walter Hines Page (August 15, 1855 – December 21, 1918) was an American journalist, publisher, and diplomat. He was the United States ambassador to Great Britain during World War I. After World War I broke out in 1914 Page was so enthusiastically in favor of Britain during the period of American neutrality (before April 1917) that Wilson and other top officials increasingly discounted his views. Page was instrumental in negotiating the sale of American war materials, including munitions, food and supplies, to the British, helping to ensure that it had the resources it needed to continue the fight against Germany.

Page made important contributions to the fields of journalism and literature. He founded the State Chronicle, a newspaper in Raleigh, North Carolina, and worked with other leaders to gain legislative approval for what is now known as North Carolina State University, which was established as a land-grant college in 1885. He worked on several newspapers, including the New York World and Evening Post, served as the editor of the Atlantic Monthly for a year between 1895 and 1896, and he also played a major role in establishing Doubleday, Page & Company, a prominent publishing house that produced the works of numerous well-known authors such as Rudyard Kipling. In addition Page was a literary critic who actively promoted the works of Southern writers, and he played a crucial part in shaping the development of Southern literature.

== Life and career ==
Page was born in Cary, North Carolina to father Allison Francis "Frank" Page and his wife, Catherine Frances Raboteau. His father built the Page-Walker Hotel about 1868. Walter started undergraduate studies at Trinity College (now Duke University), completed his bachelor's at Randolph-Macon College, and started a master's at Johns Hopkins University. His studies complete, he taught for a time in Louisville, Kentucky.

On November 15, 1880, Page married Willa Alice Wilson. They had three sons and a daughter, including Ralph Walter Page, Arthur Wilson Page, Frank Copeland Page, and Katherine Alice Page Loring. His cousin was Logan Waller Page.

Page began his journalism career as a writer and then editor at the St. Joseph Gazette in Missouri. (The St. Joseph Gazette published in that town from 1845 until June 30, 1988, when its morning position was taken over by its sister paper, the St. Joseph News-Press.) After a short time at the Gazette, in 1881 Page resigned to travel through the South, having arranged to contribute letters on southern sociological conditions to the New York World, the Springfield Republican of Massachusetts, and the Boston Post. He intended these letters to educate both the North and the South in a fuller understanding of their mutual dependence. In 1882, he joined the editorial staff of the New York World; among his major work was a series of articles on Mormonism, the result of personal investigation in Utah.

Later in 1882, Page went to Raleigh, North Carolina, where he founded the State Chronicle. Two years later, he was a founding member of the Watauga Club, along with Arthur Winslow and William Joseph Peele. Together, they petitioned the North Carolina General Assembly early in 1885 to create an institution for industrial education for "wood-work, mining, metallurgy, practical agriculture" and similar fields; establishing what is now North Carolina State University, a land-grant college, which could receive federal funds.

Page returned to New York in 1883 and for four years was on the staff of the Evening Post. From 1887 to 1895, he was manager and, after 1890, editor of The Forum, a monthly magazine. From 1895 to 1900, he was literary adviser to Houghton, Mifflin and Company, and for most of the same period editor of the Atlantic Monthly (1896–99).

From 1900 to 1913, Page was partner and vice president of Doubleday, Page & Co.; when he joined Frank Nelson Doubleday as a partner, the company's name was changed to include his. He also was editor of World's Work magazine. Doubleday, Page & Co. became one of the great book publishing companies of the 20th century. The company sometimes published under the name "Country Life Press" in Garden City, New York, where Page resided in the years prior to World War I. Among the great writers it published in its early years was Rudyard Kipling. In 1986, it was acquired by Bertelsmann AG.

Page believed that a free and open education was fundamental to democracy. In 1902, he published The Rebuilding of Old Commonwealths, which emphasized that. He felt that nothing (class, economic means, race, or religion) should be a barrier to education.

== Ambassador ==
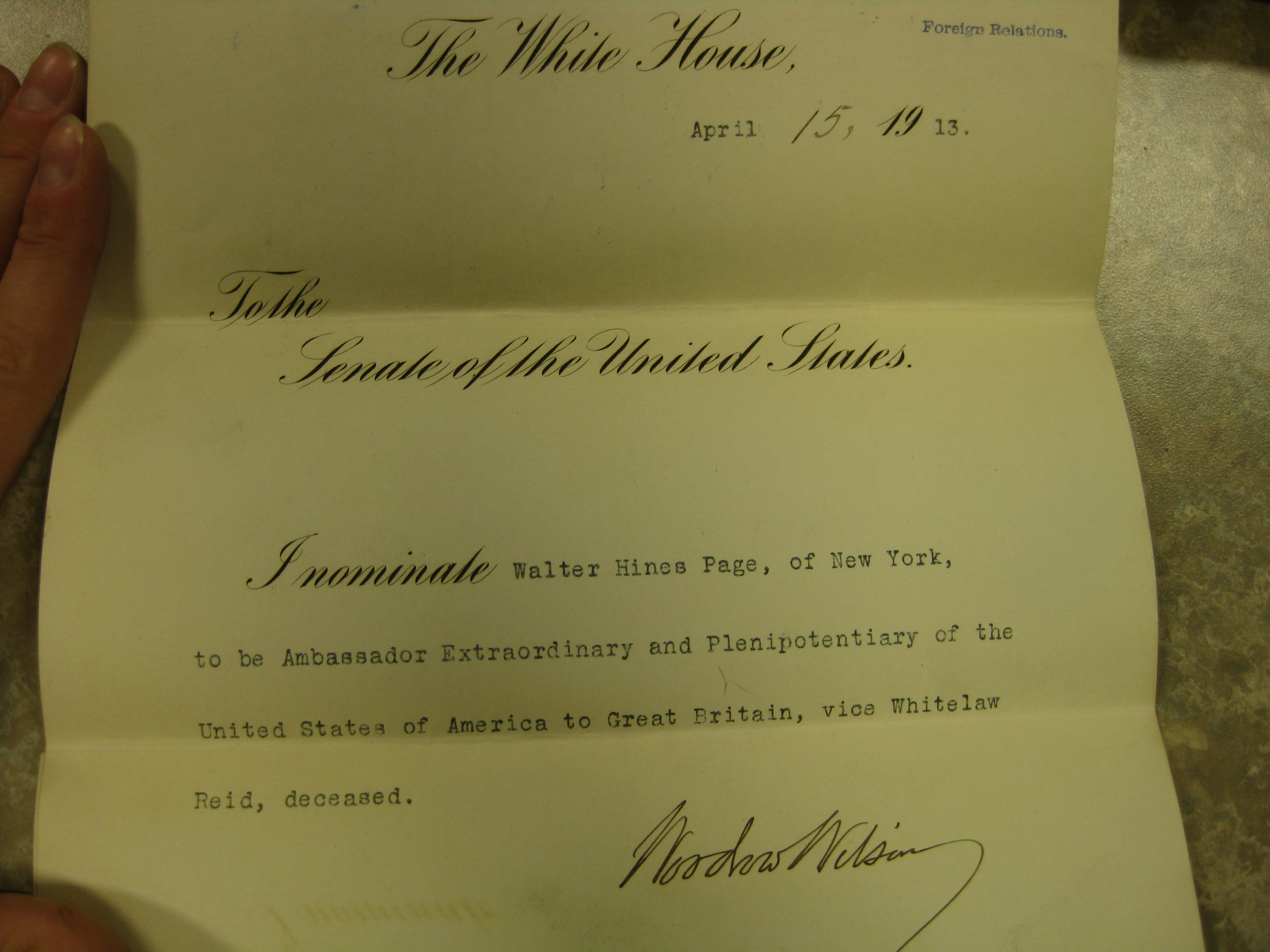
Page's UK Ambassador nomination

In March 1913, Page was appointed United States ambassador to Great Britain by President Woodrow Wilson. In August 1915, Page's daughter, Katharine, wed Boston-based architect Charles Greely Loring in a ceremony at St James's Palace in London.

Page was one of the key figures involved in bringing the United States into World War I on the Allied side. A proud Southerner, he admired his British roots and believed that the British were fighting a war for democracy. As ambassador, he defended British policies to Wilson and helped to shape a pro-Allied slant in the President and in the United States as a whole.

Page was criticized for his unabashedly pro-British stance by those who thought his priority should be defending American interests in the face of British rough handling of American shipping. He and his staff had to deal with the British claim of the right to stop and search American ships, including the examination of mail pouches; the commercial blockade (1915); and the "blacklist," the names of American firms with whom the British forbade all financial and commercial dealings by their citizens (1916).

In the fall of 1918, Page became seriously ill, forcing him to resign his post as Ambassador to the Court of St James's. He returned to his home in Pinehurst, North Carolina, where he died shortly thereafter. He is buried in Old Bethesda Cemetery in Aberdeen, North Carolina.

In the years after his death, Page was viewed as somewhat of a villain in the eyes of many revisionist American historians. Examining the decision-making processes which had led the United States to enter into the First World War, many American revisionists in the 1920s depicted Page as a traitor to his country - a modern day Benedict Arnold who used his position of trust in American service to secretly aid the machinations of the British government.

During an era in which a significant portion of the American public had come to regard the United States' entry into the European conflict as a grave mistake, Page's pro-British inclinations, and his supposedly high degree of influence over President Wilson's thinking, exposed the ambassador to charges that he had manipulated the president into intervening on behalf of the British in 1917. Subsequent historical research has shown that Page had far less influence over Wilson's thinking than was previously suggested and he is no longer believed to have played a central role in the president's decision to go to war.

== Legacy and honors ==
- A memorial plaque in his honor was installed in Westminster Abbey in Westminster, London, UK.
- The Life and Letters of Walter H. Page (1923), by Burton J. Hendrick, was awarded the Pulitzer Prize for Biography, and Hendrick's The Training of an American: The Earlier Life and Letters of Walter H. Page was awarded the Pulitzer Prize for Biography in 1929.
- The Walter Hines Page School of International Relations at Johns Hopkins University, in existence from 1930 to 1953, was named after him.
- Walter Hines Page Senior High School in Greensboro, North Carolina, the Walter Hines Page Research Professor of Literature chair (currently held by Ariel Dorfman) at Duke University, the Walter Hines Page (Now McGraw-Page) Library at Randolph-Macon College in Ashland, Va., and the London chapter of the Daughters of the American Revolution were named for him.
- Today, scholarships are awarded by the English-Speaking Union (ESU) in Walter Hines Page's name to teachers from the United Kingdom to study in the United States and Canada.
- Page Hall at North Carolina State University was named in his honor.
- The "Walter Hines Page Library" (now the 'McGraw-Page Library) at Randolph-Macon College, was originally named in his honor.

== Publication ==
- A Publisher's Confession (1905)

Diplomatic posts
Preceded by Whitelaw Reid	U.S. Ambassador to the United Kingdom; 1913–1918	Succeeded by John W. Davis
