= Robert N. Page =

American politician (1859–1933)

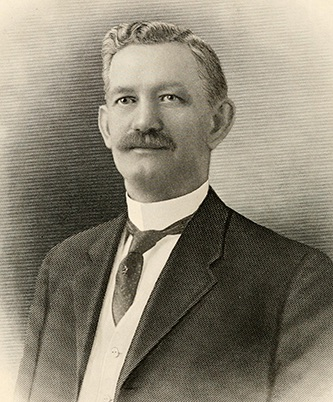

Member of the U.S. House of Representatives from North Carolina's 7th district
- In office March 4, 1903 – March 3, 1917
- Preceded by: Theodore F. Kluttz
- Succeeded by: Leonidas D. Robinson

Personal details
- Born: Robert Newton Page; October 26, 1859 Cary, North Carolina, U.S.
- Died: October 3, 1933 (aged 73) Aberdeen, North Carolina, U.S.
- Party: Democratic
- Spouse: Flora Eliza Shaw (m. 1888)
- Parent: Frank Page
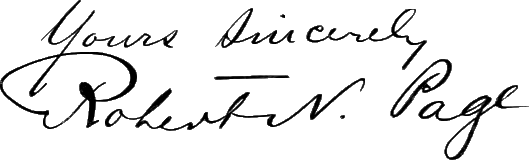
- Signature

Robert Newton Page (October 26, 1859 – October 3, 1933) was a U.S. representative from North Carolina.

== Biography ==
Born in Cary, North Carolina, Page attended the Cary High School and Bingham Military School in Mebane, North Carolina. His parents were Frank Page and Catherine Raboteau Page. He moved to Aberdeen, North Carolina, in 1880 and engaged in the lumber business near Aberdeen until 1900. He served as mayor of Aberdeen (1890–1898). Page was also the Treasurer of the Aberdeen & Asheboro Railroad Co. (1894–1902). In 1897, he moved to Biscoe, North Carolina. He served as a member of the state House of Representatives in 1901 and 1902.

Page married Flora Eliza Shaw on January 20, 1888, in Manly, North Carolina. They had four children: Thaddeus Shaw Page, Richard Eastwood Page, Robert Newton Page, Jr., and Kate Raboteau Page.

Page was elected as a Democrat to the Fifty-eighth and to the six succeeding Congresses (March 4, 1903 – March 3, 1917). He was not a candidate for renomination in 1916. He returned to Aberdeen in 1920 and that year was an unsuccessful candidate for Governor (Cameron Morrison won the primary, while O. Max Gardner came in second).

Later, Page engaged in banking, and was president of the Page Trust Co. He died in Aberdeen on October 3, 1933, and was interred in Old Bethesda Cemetery.

His elder brother was Walter Hines Page, Ambassador to Great Britain.

Page is buried in the Old Bethesda Cemetery in Aberdeen.

U.S. House of Representatives
| Preceded by Theodore F. Kluttz | Member of the U.S. House of Representatives from North Carolina's 7th congressional district 1903-1917 | Succeeded by Leonidas D. Robinson |
