= Walter Lambeth =

American politician

Member of the U.S. House of Representatives from North Carolina
- In office March 4, 1931 – January 3, 1939
- Preceded by: Hinton James (7th); Robert L. Doughton (8th)
- Succeeded by: J. Bayard Clark (7th); William O. Burgin (8th)
- Constituency: 7th district (1931-33); 8th district (1933-39)

Mayor of Thomasville, North Carolina
- In office 1925–1929

Member of the North Carolina Senate
- In office 1921

Personal details
- Born: John Walter Lambeth; January 10, 1896 Thomasville, North Carolina, U.S.
- Died: January 12, 1961 (aged 65) Washington, D.C., U.S.
- Resting place: City Cemetery, Thomasville, North Carolina, U.S.
- Party: Democratic
- Education: Trinity College; Harvard University
- Profession: Politician

Military service
- Allegiance: United States
- Branch/service: United States Army
- Years of service: 1918–1919
- Rank: Sergeant
- Battles/wars: World War I

John Walter Lambeth (January 10, 1896 – January 12, 1961) was a U.S. representative from North Carolina.

Born in Thomasville, North Carolina, Lambeth attended local public schools. He graduated from Trinity College (now Duke University), Durham, North Carolina, in 1916, and later attended Harvard. He joined the Army on January 15, 1918, and saw service in Europe during the remainder of the First World War. He was discharged with the rank of sergeant on July 26, 1919.

Lambeth worked in furniture manufacturing between 1919 and 1930, was elected to the North Carolina State Senate in 1921, and was mayor of Thomasville from 1925 to 1929. He was elected as a Democrat to the Seventy-second Congress in 1930 and was re-elected three times before declining nomination in 1938.

He died in Washington, D.C., on January 12, 1961, and is interred in the City Cemetery in Thomasville.

== Sources ==
- United States Congress. "Walter Lambeth (id: L000038)". Biographical Directory of the United States Congress.

U.S. House of Representatives
Preceded by Hinton James	Member of the U.S. House of Representatives from North Carolina's 7th congressional district 1931–1933	Succeeded by J. Bayard Clark
Preceded by Robert L. Doughton	Member of the U.S. House of Representatives from North Carolina's 8th congressional district 1933–1939	Succeeded by William O. Burgin
