= Arthur W. Page =

Arthur Wilson Page (September 10, 1883 – September 5, 1960), was a vice president and director of AT&T from 1927 to 1947. He is sometimes referred to as "the father of corporate public relations" for his work at AT&T. The company was experiencing resistance from the public to its monopolization efforts. Page is said to have established a series of public relations heuristics generally referred to as "the Page Principles".

He is widely credited with moving the public relations function out of the press office and into the corporate boardroom.

== Biography ==
Arthur was born on September 10, 1883, to Walter Hines Page and his wife, Willa Alice (née Wilson) Page, of Aberdeen, North Carolina. For his secondary education, Arthur studied at Lawrenceville School. He then attended Harvard College, graduating in 1905. He went to work at Doubleday, Page & Co., his father’s company, editing magazines, in particular The World's Work. "He wrote many powerful editorials describing and explaining the special obligations of corporations in a democratic society."

In 1927, Walter S. Gifford hired Page to become vice-president for public relations at AT&T. One of his first assignments was to prepare a speech for President Gifford to present in October that year to the National Association of Railroad and Utilities Commissioners meeting in Dallas, Texas.

In the early 1900s, AT&T had assessed that 90 percent of its press coverage was negative, which was reduced to 60 percent by changing its business practices and disseminating information to the press. According to business historian John Brooks, Page positioned the company as a public utility and increased the public's appreciation for its contributions to society.

On the other hand, Stuart Ewen wrote that AT&T used its advertising dollars with newspapers to manipulate its coverage and had their public relations team write feature stories that were published as if they were written by independent journalists.

In 1941, when the book The Bell Telephone System by A.W. Page was published, the Dallas speech was quoted in chapter 2: "Responsibility for such a large part of the entire telephone service of the country...imposes on the management an unusual obligation to the public..."

In May 1945, Page was brought in as a consultant to the Interim Committee of the Manhattan Project by his longtime friend Henry L. Stimson, the Secretary of War. His job was to help write several press releases relating to the atomic bomb that would be released after its use. He was brought in after an early draft for the presidential press release by New York Times reporter William L. Laurence was deemed unsalvageable. Page was the primary author of the statement that was released by the White House under President Harry Truman's name after the atomic bombing of Hiroshima. Page's initial draft, in May 1945, began with the line: "two hours ago an American airplane dropped a bomb on the Nagasaki Naval Base and the Naval Base ceased to exist." It is coincidental that Nagasaki was named as the example city, as it was not added to the atomic targeting list until late July. Page also authored an auxiliary press release released under Stimson's name that was sent out shortly after the Truman statement.

He is today recognized in the name of two organizations, the Arthur W. Page Society, an organization for senior public relations executives, and the Arthur W. Page Center for Integrity in Public Communication, a research center dedicated to the study and advancement of ethics and responsibility in corporate communication.
