= Aberdeen and Asheboro Railroad =

Overview
- Headquarters: Biscoe, North Carolina
- Locale: North Carolina, USA
- Dates of operation: 1897–1912
- Predecessor: Aberdeen and West End Railroad and Asheboro and Montgomery Railroad
- Successor: Norfolk Southern Railroad

Technical
- Track gauge: 4 ft 8 1/2 in (1,435 mm)
- Length: 56 mi (90 km) mainline 82 mi (132 km) total

The Aberdeen and Asheboro Railroad (A&A), known locally as "Page's Road," was the conglomeration of two previous railroads built by the Page family of Aberdeen, North Carolina, at the turn of the 20th century. The railroad ran 56 miles (90 km) to connect its namesake cities with a 20.75-mile-long (33.39 km) branch connecting Biscoe to Troy and Mount Gilead and another branch connecting West End to Jackson Springs.

== Background ==
The first railroad built by the Pages, known as the Aberdeen and West End Railroad (A&WE), had been a logging railroad since about 1887. Soon after this line connected Aberdeen and Pinehurst, shippers in Montgomery and Moore counties, who had been sending their freight by wagon to Manly on the Seaboard Air Line, created a demand for the A&WE to haul more than logs; this demand led to the line becoming a common carrier rather than an industrial line. The line was also listed as carrying passengers on one train per day in each direction between Aberdeen and Candor by 1890. It was extended from Aberdeen to Star, NC, and was completed in 1895.

In 1896, the Pages organized and built the Asheboro and Montgomery Railroad, which extended from Asheboro, NC, southward to Star.

== History ==
In 1897, the two lines merged to form the Asheboro and Aberdeen Railroad, but was known as Aberdeen and Asheboro by the end of the year. From the outset, only non-smokers were hired to work on the A&A; this was not out of health or safety concerns, but because its founder, Frank Page, "not only did not tolerate dram drinking, but was equally opposed to cigarettes."

On January 22, 1898, a runaway on the A&A occurred at Asheboro when a train's engine crew uncoupled the locomotive from the train without applying sufficient brakes on the cars; the cars were left on a hill while the engineer took the locomotive to a nearby water tower downhill. The collision pinned the engineer and fireman in the locomotive, both with non-fatal injuries. The fireman in the accident, J.M. Burns, later died on February 10, after amputation of his injured leg. Burns' family filed suit against the A&A seeking $2,500. The case was settled in December 1900 with the judge awarding $3,125 to the Burns family.

By March 1898, surveys had begun to extend the Troy branch to Mt. Gilead, with construction beginning on April 20. The extension opened later that year, appearing on timetables soon thereafter.

As traffic grew on the line, rumors began circulating by the end of 1898 that passenger services would soon be doubled with two daily trains each direction. The new trains began operating on January 3, 1899.

The railroad's founder, Frank Page, died on October 17, 1899.

On December 12, 1899, the railroad's station at Millboro was destroyed by fire; the cause was not immediately known.

Passenger services on the A&A continued to grow in 1900 with the addition of through services from the Southern Railway to Pinehurst over the A&A in February. The addition of this service enabled passengers to ride from Pinehurst to New York with only one change of cars while en route. To handle the increased traffic to Pinehurst, the A&A rebuilt the station there with a larger building opening in April 1900. Soon after the through car service was added, rumors began to circulate that the A&A had been sold to a Northern interest, with some rumors saying that the Southern Railway had bought the A&A. Henry Page, the A&A's president, was quick to deny the rumors in a letter to the newspaper that reported them, and the rumors were further disproved through contact with the Southern Railway and denied by Southern's vice president, A.B. Andrews. Southern's through service was initially handled by Southern Railway crews but was changed to A&A crews aboard the trains beginning on December 26, 1900.

The Page sons sold their interest in the lumber mills served by the A&A to W.W. Mills of Carthage in 1900. Although it was reported that the sons would not "devote their entire time to the management of their railroad property," the impact of the Southern's through service was said to have "taken from the Seaboard the monopoly of Southern Pines and Pinehurst business."

August 1900 brought a severe drought to the region, so negatively affecting the A&A's ability to fill its locomotives' boilers that some passenger services had to be annulled and the railroad was forced to warn freight shippers that they might not be able to move their cargo. The effects of the drought, although severe, were not enough to stop the railroad's further expansion, with a branch from West End to Jackson Springs announced the following month, and completed in early 1901. Through service over the new branch to Jackson Springs from the Seaboard Railroad began on June 17, 1901.

With more connections and greater service frequencies, other local railroads also sought to connect to the A&A with the Durham and Charlotte Railroad completing its line to Star in 1901. But even with the increased demand for service over the A&A, both from local residents and from other railroad companies operating interchange and through service, the railroad's management refused to operate the railroad on Sundays.

At a meeting of many area railroad officials in Raleigh on June 28, 1902, the A&A agreed to adopt per diem fees for freight cars in interchange service replacing mileage charges that were previously assessed.

At a meeting of industry and political leaders on July 1, 1903, Robert N. Page, who by that time was a state congressman while also retaining his position as A&A secretary and treasurer, pledged A&A resources and logistics for use in the North Carolina state exhibit at the St. Louis Worlds Fair of 1904. By August 1903, the A&A was valued at $330,000, for which it was assessed $822 in taxes by the state.

At the close of receivership for the Atlantic and North Carolina Railroad in March 1904, Henry Page, the A&A president, was one of three executives, with R.T. Gray of the Cape Fear and Yadkin Valley Railroad and businessman W.T. Lee of Haywood, who were tasked with inspecting the A&NC property.

On May 13, 1904, a major fire burned in Biscoe that destroyed the A&A's station, offices and restaurant there.

An A&A passenger train derailed and fell down a small embankment near the Troy station on January 24, 1905, killing Reverend G.A. Oglesby, who was "one of the most prominent Methodist ministers in the state," and his son and injuring many more. Early reports indicated that the rails had spread out of gauge to cause the accident, which was called the worst in the A&A's history. Cleanup of the wreckage lasted more than a week with crews working into February. Representative Robert Page, who was still acting treasurer of the A&A was requested to be the administrator of Oglesby's estate after the accident, a position that was considered likely to cause a conflict of interest.

In Summer 1905 the Page brothers purchased the electric streetcar company in Pinehurst; track gangs began removing some of the street trackage on Broad Street in September 1905. Rumors suggested that the streetcar line was going to be incorporated into the A&A system with a new Pinehurst station to be built in the city and the line would be operated by steam power with the rest of the railroad. This connection allowed the A&A to connect directly to the Seaboard Air Line at Pinehurst, in addition to its existing Southern Railway connections, and would enable additional through trains to be run to major markets. By this time, there were as many as 11 A&A passenger trains serving Pinehurst daily.

In 1906 the A&A opened a new Land and Industrial Department office, headed by Manly Luck, with the goal of increasing settlement along the A&A line. Also in 1906, a new railroad line was planned to connect Carthage to a point on the A&A either in Pinehurst or West End. By December it was known as the Carthage extension of the A&A.

On December 3, 1906, the A&A was the scene of another derailment and wreck; around 6:00 a.m. local time, a special circus train for Spark's shows derailed at Roberdo, a flag stop four miles south of Troy. The cause of the accident was not immediately evident. A livestock handler riding in one of the train's horse cars was crushed to death when the car overturned and several horses landed on top of him; two other show workers were seriously injured. In the aftermath of the accident the A&A crew and the show crew got into a fight. Members of the show crew placed blame for the accident on the train's conductor, Mr. Slack, and beat him senseless in the melee.

The A&A later became part of the Norfolk Southern Railroad in 1912.
