= Caraleigh Mills =

Historic mill in North Carolina, US

- U.S. National Register of Historic Places
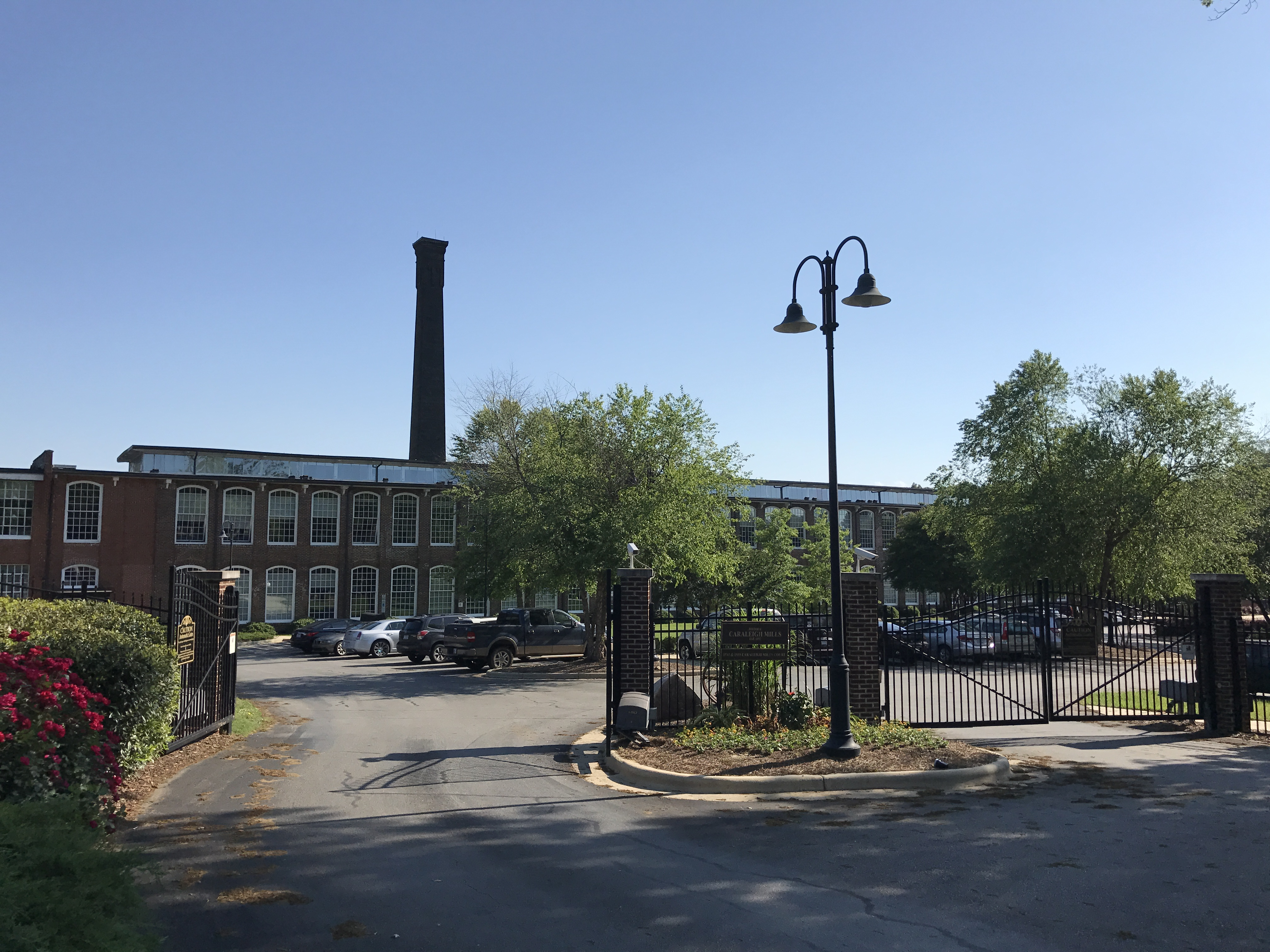

- Location within North Carolina Location within the United States
- Location: 421 Maywood Ave., Raleigh, North Carolina
- Coordinates: 35°45′41″N 78°39′12″W
- Area: 14.3 acres (5.8 ha)
- Built: 1892
- Architectural style: Italianate
- NRHP reference No.: 01000557
- Added to NRHP: May 25, 2001

Caraleigh Mills, also known as the Fred Whitaker Company, is a historic textile mill located at Raleigh, Wake County, North Carolina. The original section was built in 1892, and is a two-story, Italianate-style brick structure with an intact monitor roof and a raised stone foundation. The building had an expansion added about 1900, an addition built about 1910, a wing and warehouse added about 1919, and a modernization in the late 1950s. The mill operated until 1999, and is one of three remaining late-19th century textile mills in Raleigh.

It was listed on the National Register of Historic Places in 2001.

The mill has been converted to residential use as condominiums. The 84 units became available for sale and occupancy in 2003. The name Caraleigh Mills was preserved.
