= William C. Hammer =

American politician

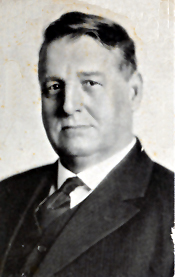

Member of the U.S. House of Representatives from North Carolina's 7th district
- In office March 4, 1921 – September 26, 1930
- Preceded by: Leonidas D. Robinson
- Succeeded by: Hinton James

United States Attorney for the Western District of North Carolina
- In office 1914–1920
- President: Woodrow Wilson
- Preceded by: Alfred E. Holton
- Succeeded by: Stonewall J. Durham

Personal details
- Born: William Cicero Hammer; March 24, 1865 Randolph, North Carolina
- Died: September 26, 1930 (aged 65) Asheboro, North Carolina
- Party: Democratic
- Education: University of North Carolina

William Cicero Hammer (March 24, 1865 – September 26, 1930) was a U.S. representative from North Carolina.

== Biography ==
Born near Asheboro, North Carolina, Hammer attended private and common schools. He studied at Yadkin Institute and Western Maryland College, Westminster, Maryland. He taught school and was principal of two academies. He was graduated in law from the University of North Carolina at Chapel Hill in 1891. He was admitted to the bar in September 1891 and commenced practice in Asheboro, North Carolina. He served as mayor of Asheboro, member of the city council, school commissioner (1895–1899), and local Superintendent of public instruction (1891–1895 and again in 1899-1901). He served as solicitor (district attorney) in the superior court 1901-1914. For more than forty years, Hammer was owner and editor of the Asheboro Courier. He was appointed United States attorney for the Western District of North Carolina on February 24, 1914, and served until September 20, 1920.

Hammer was elected as a Democrat to the Sixty-seventh and to the four succeeding Congresses and served from March 4, 1921, until his death in Asheboro, North Carolina, September 26, 1930. He was interred in City Cemetery.

== See also ==
- List of members of the United States Congress who died in office (1900–1949)

== Sources ==
- United States Congress. "William C. Hammer (id: H000123)". Biographical Directory of the United States Congress.

U.S. House of Representatives
Preceded by Leonidas D. Robinson	Member of the U.S. House of Representatives from North Carolina's 7th congressional district 1921-1930	Succeeded by Hinton James
