= The World's Work =

American monthly magazine

- Former editors: Walter Hines Page; Arthur W. Page
- Frequency: Monthly
- Founded: 1900
- Final issue: 1932
- Country: United States
- Based in: New York City
- Language: English

The World's Work (1900–1932) was a monthly magazine that covered national affairs from a pro-business point of view. It was produced by the publishing house Doubleday, Page and Company, which provided the first editor, Walter Hines Page. The first issue appeared in November 1900, with an initial press run of 35,000.

With the backing of the mail order department at Doubleday, Page, the magazine climbed to a circulation of 100,000. In 1913, Page's son Arthur became the editor.

The World's Work cost 25 cents an issue and was a physically attractive product; there were photo essays, some of which after 1916 contained color images.

The magazine tracked closely with Page's ideas: the feature articles worried about immigration from non-English-speaking countries and the declining birth rate among more educated Americans. Concerns about the spread of labor unions and socialism also played out in the magazine. But the overarching editorial purpose of World's Work was to defend the integrity of big business, even as other magazines were beginning the muckraking tradition.

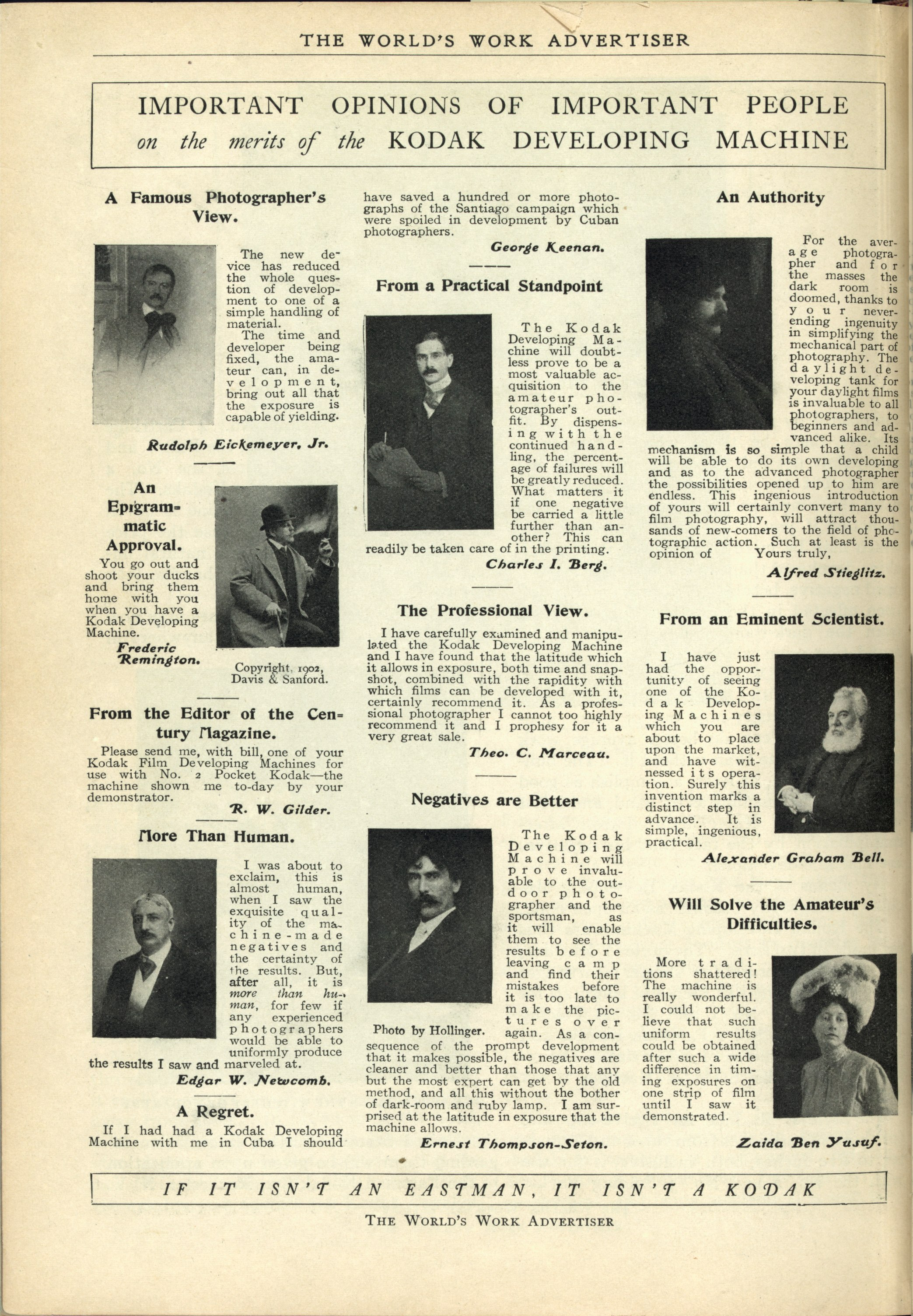
An advertisement in The World's Work from October 1902 for the Kodak developing machine.

There were sections each issue highlighting industries' contributions to society. The more people knew about how business operated, World's Work argued, the more they would approve. The spirit of that message was captured in a multipart article from 1911 by Arthur Wallace Dunn, "How a Business Man Would Run the Government: The Specific Items in Which He Would Save 300 Millions a Year."

In 1932, The World's Work was purchased by and merged into the journal Review of Reviews. But its vision lived on in Arthur, who later became a vice president and director at AT&T, where he is credited as the "father of corporate public relations."

== See also ==
- The Bookman
- Harper's Magazine
- McClure's Magazine
- Munsey's Magazine
- The Outlook
