= Hinton James (politician) =

American politician

Hinton James (April 24, 1884 – November 3, 1948) was a U.S. Congressman from the state of North Carolina between 1930 and 1931.

James, born in Laurinburg, North Carolina, attended Davidson College and became a cotton merchant in Laurinburg. He was elected to the Laurinburg city council in 1917 and elected mayor in 1919; he served a single two-year term. James was elected to the 71st United States Congress in 1930 in a special election to fill the vacancy caused by the death of William C. Hammer; he served from November 4, 1930, to March 3, 1931 and was not a candidate for election to the 72nd U.S. Congress. He returned to business after his time in Congress and was a member of the Laurinburg school board from 1941 to 1945 and was North Carolina commissioner of game and inland fisheries during those same years. He also was a member of the Scotland County Democratic executive committee. James remained a resident of Laurinburg as a cotton and produce merchant until his death in 1948. He is interred in Laurinburg's Hillside Cemetery.

U.S. House of Representatives
Preceded by William C. Hammer	Member of the U.S. House of Representatives from North Carolina's 7th congressional district November 4, 1930 – March 3, 1931	Succeeded by Walter Lambeth
