= Biscoe, North Carolina =

- Town
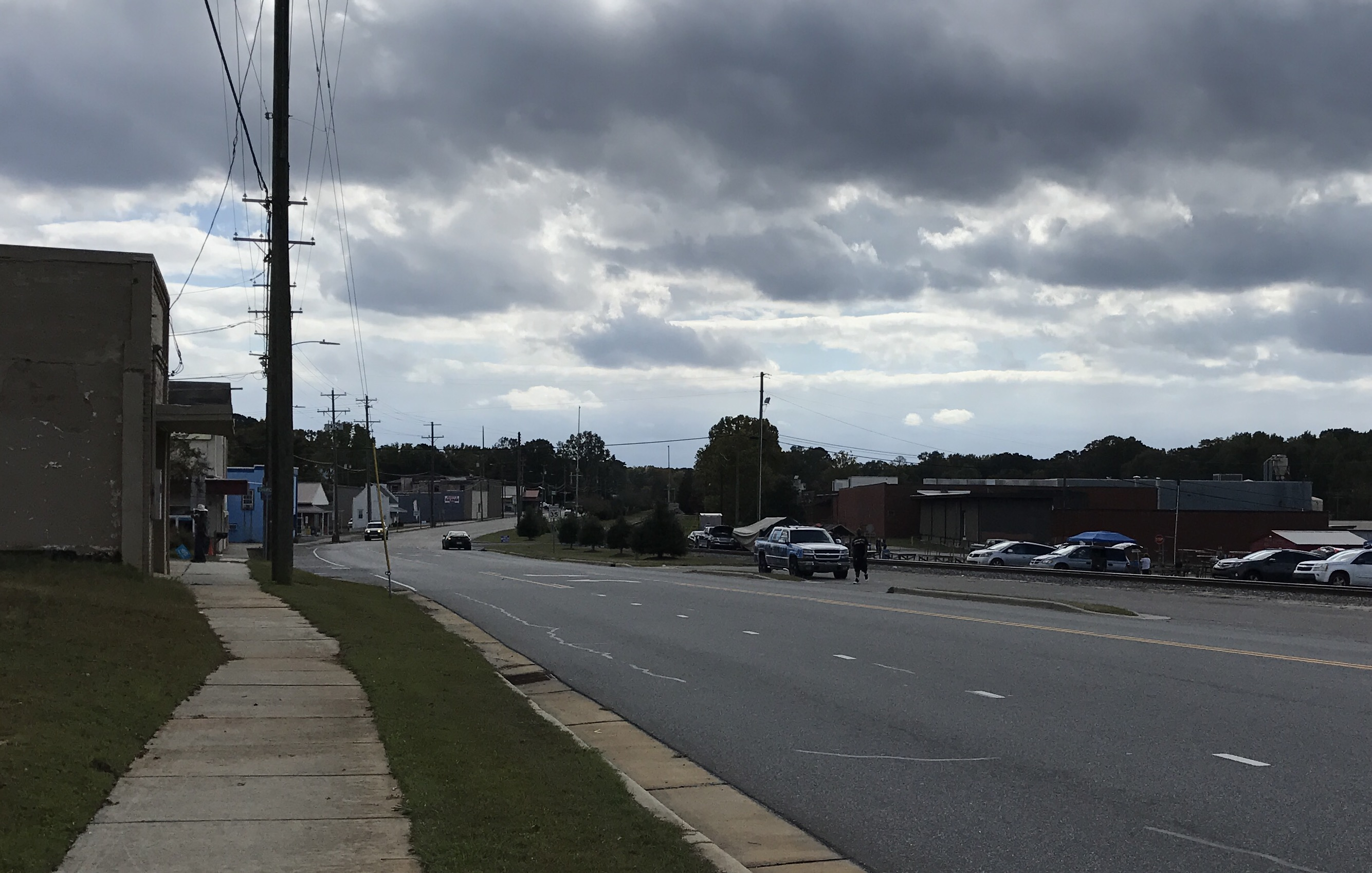
- U.S. Route 220 in Biscoe
- Motto: "A Dream Worth Dreaming"
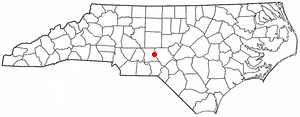
- Location in North Carolina
- Coordinates: 35°21′32″N 79°46′47″W
- Country: United States
- State: North Carolina
- County: Montgomery

Government
  - Mayor: Grant Hinson

Area
  - Total: 2.91 sq mi (7.54 km^{2})
  - Land: 2.91 sq mi (7.54 km^{2})
  - Water: 0 sq mi (0.00 km^{2})
- Elevation: 617 ft (188 m)

Population (2020)
  - Total: 1,848
  - Density: 635.0/sq mi (245.19/km^{2})
- Time zone: UTC-5 (Eastern (EST))
  - Summer (DST): UTC-4 (EDT)
- ZIP Code: 27209
- Area codes: 910, 472
- FIPS code: 37-06000
- GNIS feature ID: 2405268
- Website: www.townofbiscoe.com

Biscoe is a town in Montgomery County, North Carolina, United States. The population was 1,848 at the 2020 census, up from 1,700 in 2010. The town is named after Henry Biscoe, an important customer of the local lumber business.

== History ==
The area was formerly called "Filo". The current name was adopted in 1895.

Biscoe's past was dependent on the railroad industry, and it was once an important repair center for railroad equipment. The Aberdeen and West End Railroad (owned by the Page family of Aberdeen, North Carolina) completed a branch to Star from Filo (current Biscoe) in 1895. The A & W. E. R.R. was merged into the Aberdeen and Asheboro Railroad in 1897.

Biscoe was incorporated in 1901.

== Geography ==
Biscoe is in eastern Montgomery County. U.S. Route 220 Alternate and North Carolina Highways 24 and 27 cross in the center of town. US 220 Alt leads north 13 miles (21 km) to Seagrove and south 5 miles (8 km) to Candor. Highways 24 and 27 together lead west 6 miles (10 km) to Troy (the Montgomery county seat) and 28 miles (45 km) to Albemarle, and east 23 miles (37 km) to Carthage. The Interstate 73/Interstate 74/U.S. Route 220 freeway passes through the east side of Biscoe, with access from Exit 49 (NC 24/27); the freeway leads north 26 miles (42 km) to Asheboro and south 32 miles (51 km) to Rockingham.

According to the U.S. Census Bureau, the town of Biscoe has a total area of 2.9 square miles (7.5 km^{2}), all land. The town sits on a ridge which drains west to tributaries of the Little River, part of the Pee Dee River watershed, and east to Lick Creek, part of the Deep River watershed leading to the Cape Fear River.

== Demographics ==
Historical population
Census	Pop.	Note	%±
1910	697		—
1920	755		8.3%
1930	819		8.5%
1940	843		2.9%
1950	1,034		22.7%
1960	1,053		1.8%
1970	1,244		18.1%
1980	1,334		7.2%
1990	1,484		11.2%
2000	1,700		14.6%
2010	1,700		0.0%
2020	1,848		8.7%
U.S. Decennial Census

=== 2020 census ===
As of the 2020 census, Biscoe had a population of 1,848. The median age was 36.4 years. 26.8% of residents were under the age of 18 and 19.4% of residents were 65 years of age or older. For every 100 females, there were 94.3 males, and for every 100 females age 18 and over there were 89.0 males age 18 and over.

0.0% of residents lived in urban areas, while 100.0% lived in rural areas.

There were 625 households in Biscoe, of which 41.1% had children under the age of 18 living in them. Of all households, 40.2% were married-couple households, 17.9% were households with a male householder and no spouse or partner present, and 32.6% were households with a female householder and no spouse or partner present. About 23.1% of all households were made up of individuals and 10.9% had someone living alone who was 65 years of age or older.

There were 669 housing units, of which 6.6% were vacant. The homeowner vacancy rate was 0.0% and the rental vacancy rate was 4.5%.

Biscoe racial composition
Race	Number	Percentage
White (non-Hispanic)	702	37.99%
Black or African American (non-Hispanic)	446	24.13%
Native American	4	0.22%
Asian	21	1.14%
Other/Mixed	41	2.22%
Hispanic or Latino	634	34.31%

=== 2000 census ===
As of the census of 2000, there were 1,700 people, 535 households, and 393 families residing in the town. The population density was 855.8 people per square mile (330.4 people/km^{2}). There were 572 housing units at an average density of 287.9 per square mile (111.2/km^{2}). The racial makeup of the town was 58.35% White, 24.47% African American, 0.35% Native American, 0.59% Asian, 15.47% from other races, and 0.76% from two or more races. Hispanic or Latino of any race were 23.24% of the population.

There were 535 households, out of which 38.7% had children under the age of 18 living with them, 52.9% were married couples living together, 14.6% had a female householder with no husband present, and 26.4% were non-families. 21.7% of all households were made up of individuals, and 9.7% had someone living alone who was 65 years of age or older. The average household size was 2.97 and the average family size was 3.42.

In the town, the population was spread out, with 28.6% under the age of 18, 11.2% from 18 to 24, 25.6% from 25 to 44, 19.5% from 45 to 64, and 15.1% who were 65 years of age or older. The median age was 34 years. For every 100 females, there were 92.7 males. For every 100 females age 18 and over, there were 87.3 males.

The median income for a household in the town was $35,667, and the median income for a family was $37,500. Males had a median income of $23,214 versus $21,089 for females. The per capita income for the town was $15,302. About 8.5% of families and 11.8% of the population were below the poverty line, including 16.4% of those under age 18 and 6.7% of those age 65 or over.

== Notable people ==
Former U.S. Congressman Larry Kissell is a resident of Biscoe.

Former WRAL-TV news anchor Charlie Gaddy grew up in Biscoe.
